Varèse Sarabande is an American record label that is owned by Concord Music, which specializes in film scores and original cast recordings.

VC/VX series (1978)
Starting in 1978, Varèse Sarabande released both classical works and motion picture soundtracks on vinyl (LP) using the same label numbering series (VC or VX being the prefix). Some of these titles would later see a CD release in the 47000 series or later by the label or be reissued by other soundtrack labels including Intrada Records, Kritzerland Records, Citadel Records and more.

 VC-81028 The First Nudie Musical - Bruce Kimmel
 VC-81040 Piano Improvisations, Duet From Act. I - Korngold
 VC-81051 Milhaud, Joys of Life / Globetrotter Suite - Milhaud
 VC-81053 Rózsa Conducts Rózsa: Volume 1 - Miklós Rózsa
 VC-81056 William Dawson: Negro Folk Symphony - Stokowski
 VC-81058 Rózsa: Lust for Life & Background of Violence Suites - Miklos Rosza
 VX-81060 Orchestral Space - Seiji Ozawa
 VX-81061 Ohki: Night Meditation / Fukai: 4 Movements / Kiyose: Japanese Festival Dances / Yamada: Mandara no hana - Yamaoka
 VX-81062 Saburō Moroi: Symphony #2 - Yamaoka / Yomiuri Nippon Orchestra
 VC-81070 Master of the World - Les Baxter
 VC-81071 36 Hours - Dimitri Tiomkin
 VC-81072 Silent Running - Peter Schickele (Reissued by the label as both a green vinyl LP, which is very valuable, and a standard regular LP)
 VC-81073 The Quiet Man - Victor Young
 VC-81073 Samson and Delilah - Victor Young
 VC-81074 Written on the Wind - Frank Skinner, Victor Young / Four Girls in Town - Alex North
 VC-81075 A Time to Love and a Time to Die - Miklós Rózsa
 VC-81076 This Earth Is Mine - Hugo Friedhofer
 VC-81077 Themes from Classic Science Fiction, Fantasy and Horror Films - various artists / Dick Jacobs conductor
 VC-81078 Goliath and the Barbarians - Les Baxter
 VC-81080 Piano Concerto No. 5 "Emperor" - Beethoven
 VC-81081 Holdridge Conducts Holdridge - Lee Holdridge, Los Angeles String Orchestra and the London Symphony Orchestra (The very first dbx produced title by the label classical work by the composer which would later be released on CD and features the debut of Lalo Schifrin's "Love Theme" from the 1973 film, Hit!)
 VC-81082 Brass Target - Laurence Rosenthal
 VC-81083 Stages - Bruce Kimmel
 VC-81084 Yatsu Haka-mura - Yasushi Akutagawa
 VC-81085 Roy Harris: Concerto for Amplified Piano, Brass & Percussion, etc. - Harris / UCLA Brass
 VC-81090 Respighi: Concerto gregoriano / de Beriot: Scene de Ballet - Borsamsky / Kegel
 VC-81091 Prokofiev: Gypsy Fantasial Sym Suite of Waltzes / Balakirev: Overture on Russian Themes - Schwleger
 VC-81092 Felix Draeseke: Symphony No. 3 in C major "Symphonia tragica", Op. 40 - Berlin Symphony Orchestra, Hermann Desser (Heinz Drewes) *Reissue of Urania LP-7162
 VC-81097 Darius Milhaud, Le Train Bleu, Auric, Les Facheux / Satie - Markevitch
 VC-81101 Jerome Moross: Two World Premiere Works from an American Master - Jerome Moross
 VC-81102 Tourist Trap - Pino Donaggio
 VC-81103 The Dunwich Horror - Les Baxter
 VC-81104 King of Kings - Miklós Rózsa
 VC-81105 Phantasm - Fred Myrow, Malcolm Seagrave
 VC-81106 Dawn of the Dead - Goblin
 VC-81107 Patrick - Brian May
 VC-81123 Roy Harris: Quintet for Piano and Strings, String Quartet No. 3
 VC-81127 Martin - Donald Rubinstein

STV and CTV series (1979–1987)
Beginning in 1979, Varèse Sarabande changed their TV and soundtracks to their own individual lettering prefix with the letters STV to separate them from their classical releases and avoid confusion. Many of these titles originally issued by the label have seen a CD release (refer to the 47000 series and the CD Club release lists below) by the label itself or through other labels over the last few decades which include Intrada Records, Citadel Records, Kritzerland Records and more.

The CD and LP counterparts were both made for most titles between 1984 and 1990, when LPs starting to be on the way out in favor of the new media-friendly format that would also hold more music unlike LPs which only run up to 45 minutes. Many of these titles were also available in cassette form, designated by CTV prefix unlike the CD and LP prefixes to distinguish the three formats. The label would make a deal with MCA Distributing in 1987 as part of a feverish raid by record companies to buy up other smaller, independent record labels thanks to the booming economy of that period when the stock market was high that also included labels like A&M Records, Island, and eventually, GRP Records in later years. The label would completely thrive and grow to great lengths after the MCA deal and would enjoy a lot of success with the soundtracks and eventually Broadway divisions throughout the 1990s and well into 2020.

Georges Delerue's A Little Romance, would go on to win the 1979 Best Original Score at the 1980 Oscar ceremony thanks to a very aggressive campaign by the label and the advice of future producer Bruce Kimmel, in which LPs of the soundtracks were sent to the Academy voters that year earning them a unique honor in the process.

 STV-81108 Fedora - Miklós Rózsa
 STV-81109 A Little Romance - Georges Delerue
 STV-81115 The Young Lions - Hugo Friedhofer
 STV-81116 Island in the Sky - Alfred Newman / The Song of Bernadette - Hugo Friedhofer, Emil Newman, Herbert W. Spencer
 STV-81117 Blood and Sand - Alfred Newman / Blood for Dracula - Claudio Gizzi / Golden Earrings - Victor Young
 STV-81118 Magnificent Obsession - Frank Skinner
 STV-81119 Boy on a Dolphin - Hugo Friedhofer
 STV-81120 One Step Beyond - Harry Lubin
 STV-81121 Man of a Thousand Faces - Frank Skinner
 STV-81122 It Started in Naples - Carlo Savina / Alessandro Cicognini
 STV-81124 Rio Grande - Victor Young
 STV-81125 Anastasia - Alfred Newman
 STV-81126 Piranha - Pino Donaggio
 STV-81127 Martin - Donald Rubinstein
 STV-81128 Knights of the Round Table - Miklós Rózsa
 STV-81129 Meetings with Remarkable Men - Laurence Rosenthal / Thomas de Hartmann
 STV-81130 Destination Moon - Leith Stevens
 STV-81131 Bloodline - Ennio Morricone, Craig Hundley (additional music)
 STV-81132 An Almost Perfect Affair - Georges Delerue
 STV-81133 Eye of the Needle - Miklós Rózsa (re-recording)
 STV-81134 Escape from New York - John Carpenter, Alan Howarth
 STV-81135 The 7th Voyage of Sinbad - Bernard Herrmann
 STV-81136 The Devil at 4 O'Clock - George Duning
 STV-81137 Prince of the City - Paul Chihara / Georges Delerue conductor
 STV-81138 1001 Arabian Nights - George Duning
 STV-81139 Home Movies - Pino Donaggio
 STV-81140 The Day Time Ended - Richard Band
 STV-81141 True Confessions - Georges Delerue
 STV-81142 Seven Samurai / Rashomon - Fumio Hayasaka
 STV-81143 Maniac - Jay Chattaway
 STV-81144 Mad Max - Brian May
 STV-81145 The Wild Bunch - Jerry Fielding
 STV-81146 John Paul Jones - Max Steiner
 STV-81147 The Island - Ennio Morricone
 STV-81148 Dressed to Kill - Pino Donaggio
 STV-81149 Enola Gay: The Men, the Mission, the Atomic Bomb - Maurice Jarre
 STV-81150 The Howling - Pino Donaggio
 STV-81151 Night of the Living Dead - Spencer Moore / various artists (LP features library music from the classic 1968 horror film. Released on both green and red vinyl)
 STV-81152 Halloween II - John Carpenter, Alan Howarth
 STV-81153 The Formula - Bill Conti
 STV-81154 Swamp Thing - Harry Manfredini
 STV-81155 Mad Max 2: The Road Warrior - Brian May
 STV-81156 Blood for Dracula - Claudio Gizzi
 STV-81157 Flesh for Frankenstein - Claudio Gizzi
 STV-81158 The Sword and the Sorcerer - David Whitaker
 STV-81159 The Twelve Chairs - John Morris
 STV-81160 Creepshow - John Harrison
 STV-81162 The Burning - Rick Wakeman
 STV-81163 Slapstick (Of Another Kind) - Morton Stevens, Michel Legrand (This was the first soundtrack to release both the used and rejected scores for a particular film which was very unusual at the time. Stevens was featured in the film and put on side A and Legrand's rejected score was on side B)
 STV-81164 Eating Raoul - Arlon Ober
 STV-81165 Friendly Persuasion - Dimitri Tiomkin
 STV-81166 Last Embrace (re-recording) / Lydia - Miklós Rózsa
 STV-81167 The Man from Snowy River - Bruce Rowland
 STV-81169 The Secret of NIMH - Jerry Goldsmith
 STV-81170 Forbidden Zone - Danny Elfman / Oingo Boingo
 STV-81171 The Twilight Zone - various artists
 STV-81172 10 to Midnight - Robert O. Ragland
 STV-81173 Videodrome - Howard Shore
 STV-81174 The Beastmaster - Lee Holdridge
 STV-81175 La Notte Di San Lorenzo - Nicola Piovani
 STV-81176 Halloween - John Carpenter
 STV-81178 The Twilight Zone: Volume Two - various artists
 STV-81179 Magic Fire - Richard Wagner / Erich Wolfgang Korngold
 STV-81180 The Winds of War - Bob Cobert
 STV-81181 Liquid Sky - Slava Tsukerman, Brenda Hutchinson, Clive Smith
 STV-81182 The Year of Living Dangerously - Maurice Jarre
 STV-81184 The Hunger - Michel Rubini, Denny Jaeger / various artists
 STV-81185 The Twilight Zone: Volume Three - various artists
 STV-81186 Young Warriors - Robert J. Walsh
 STV-81187 Hercules - Pino Donaggio
 STV-81188 The Final Option - Roy Budd / Jerry Donahue & Marc Donahue (The film is titled Who Dares Wins in Europe. The Milan Records LP features more music not available on this release)
 STV-81189 Invitation au voyage - Gabriel Yared
 STV-81190 Il Gattopardo - Nino Rota
 STV-81191 The Fog - John Carpenter
 STV-81192 The Twilight Zone: Volume Four - various artists
 STV-81193 A Minor Miracle - Rick Patterson
 STV-81194 Heat and Dust - Richard Robbins / Zakir Hussain
 STV-81195 Revenge of the Ninja - Robert J. Walsh
 STV-81197 Brainstorm - James Horner (Digital re-recording of original soundtrack from 1983 film recorded with the London Symphony Orchestra and Chorus)
 STV-81198 The Osterman Weekend - Lalo Schifrin
 STV-81199 The Evil Dead - Joseph LoDuca
 STV-81202 Blind Date - Stanley Myers / John Kongos (songs)
 STV-81203 Children of the Corn - Jonathan Elias
 STV-81204 Making the Grade - Basil Poledouris / various artists
 STV-81205 The Twilight Zone: Volume Five - various artists
 STV-81206 Gorky Park - James Horner
 STV-81207 Wavelength - Tangerine Dream
 STV-81208 Lassiter - Ken Thorne
 STV-81209 Mutant - Richard Band
 STV-81210 Blame It on Rio - Kenneth Wannberg / various artists
 STV-81211 Sahara - Ennio Morricone
 STV-81212 Roy Rogers and the Sons of the Pioneers - various artists
 STV-81213 Oltre la Porta - Pino Donaggio
 STV-81217 Berlin Alexanderplatz - Peer Raben
 STV-81219 Top Secret! - Maurice Jarre
 STV-81220 Cousteau - Amazon Part 1: The River - John Scott
 STV-81221 Careful, He Might Hear You - Ray Cook
 STV-81222 The Fourth Man - Loek Dikker
 STV-81224 Swann in Love - Hans Werner Henze / Die Verlorene Ehre Der Katharina Blum Oder: Wie Gewalt Entstehen Und Wohin Sie Führen Kann
 STV-81225 Sheena - Richard Hartley
 STV-81226 Until September - John Barry
 STV-81227 La Pirate - Philippe Sarde / Un Dimanche à La Campagne - Louis Ducreux, Marc Perrone
 STV-81228 Bolero - Peter Bernstein / Elmer Bernstein
 STV-81229 Places in the Heart - John Kander / Howard Shore
 STV-81230 Phar Lap - Bruce Rowland
 STV-81231 Supergirl - Jerry Goldsmith (Notable for being released without the synthesizer overdubs that were featured in the score, along with a track name that is actually a slate number "9M3" which is for a particular reel and scene for the film)
 STV-81232 The Flamingo Kid - various artists (Interesting curiosity in which Motown Records released the soundtrack featuring more songs than this LP)
 STV-81233 Starman - Jack Nitzsche
 STV-81234 Runaway - Jerry Goldsmith
 STV-81235 The Shooting Party - John Scott
 STV-81236 A Nightmare on Elm Street - Charles Bernstein
 STV-81237 Witness - Maurice Jarre
 STV-81239 Certain Fury - George Massenburg, Russell Kunkel, Bill Payne
 STV-81240 The Aviator - Dominic Frontiere
 STV-81241 Cat's Eye - Alan Silvestri
 STV-81242 The Company of Wolves - George Fenton
 STV-81243 The Gods Must Be Crazy - John Boshoff
 STV-81244 The Emerald Forest - Junior Homrich with Brian Gascoigne
 STV-81245 Christopher Columbus - Riz Ortolani
 STV-81246 Rambo: First Blood Part II - Jerry Goldsmith
 STV-81247 Just the Way You Are - Vladimir Cosma / Wetherby - Nick Bicât
 STV-81248 Red Sonja - Ennio Morricone
 STV-81249 Lifeforce - Henry Mancini
 STV-81250 Music of the Republic Studios Serials - William Lava, Cy Feuer, Paul Sawtell / James King conductor
 STV-81251 Dance with a Stranger - Richard Hartley
 STV-81252 Jagged Edge - John Barry
 STV-81253 The Black Cauldron - Elmer Bernstein
 STV-81254 The Bride - Maurice Jarre
 STV-81255  - Jürgen Knieper
 STV-81256 Flesh+Blood - Basil Poledouris
 STV-81257 Agnes of God - Georges Delerue
 STV-81258 Paroles et Musique - Michel Legrand
 STV-81259 The Red Pony - Aaron Copland
 STV-81260 Return to Eden - Brian May
 STV-81261 Re-Animator - Richard Band
 STV-81262 Zone Troopers / The Alchemist - Richard Band
 STV-81263 Invasion U.S.A. - Jay Chattaway
 STV-81264 Silver Bullet - Jay Chattaway
 STV-81265 Marie - Francis Lai
 STV-81266 Year of the Dragon - David Mansfield
 STV-81267 Transylvania 6-5000 - Lee Holdridge
 STV-81268  - Elmer Bernstein
 STV-81269 Subway - Éric Serra
 STV-81270 Spies Like Us - Elmer Bernstein
 STV-81271 Enemy Mine - Maurice Jarre
 STV-81272 The Final Conflict - Jerry Goldsmith
 STV-81273 Mountbatten: The Last Viceroy - John Scott
 STV-81274 The Clan of the Cave Bear - Alan Silvestri
 STV-81275 A Nightmare on Elm Street Part 2: Freddy's Revenge - Christopher Young
 STV-81276 F/X - Bill Conti
 STV-81277 Ginger e Fred - Nicola Piovani
 STV-81278 April Fool's Day - Charles Bernstein
 STV-81279 Crawlspace - Pino Donaggio
 STV-81281 The Ewok Adventure / Ewoks: The Battle for Endor - Peter Bernstein
 STV-81282 The Manhattan Project - Philippe Sarde
 STV-81283 Aliens - James Horner
 STV-81284 Apology - Maurice Jarre
 STV-81285 Jake Speed - Mark Snow
 STV-81286 Raw Deal - Cinemascore
 STV-81287 Roman Polanski's Pirates - Philippe Sarde (The LP features less music than its CD counterpart. Please see 47000 series of CD for information)
 STV-81288 Vamp - Jonathan Elias
 STV-81289 The Fly - Howard Shore (The LP features less music than its CD counterpart. Please see 47000 series of CD for information)
 STV-81290 Where the River Runs Black - James Horner
 STV-81291 Deadly Friend - Charles Bernstein (This is not the orchestral score recorded with the Hollywood Symphony Orchestra, but the synthesizer demos of the score. These were released due to the high reuse fees of the American Federation of Musicians for reuse on soundtrack releases at the time. The complete orchestral score would be released by Perseverance Records in 2007 and Varèse Sarabande reissued it in 2016 in The Little Box of Horrors limited edition collection)
 STV-81292 Blue Velvet - Angelo Badalamenti (Popular soundtrack to cult 1986 film features songs by Roy Orbison and Julee Cruise)
 STV-81293 Tai-Pan - Maurice Jarre
 STV-81294 Link - Jerry Goldsmith
 STV-81295 Peggy Sue Got Married - John Barry / various artists
 STV-81296 Crocodile Dundee - Peter Best
 STV-81297 Sky Bandits - Alfi Kabiljo
 STV-81298 Crimes of the Heart - Georges Delerue
 STV-81299 The Boy Who Could Fly - Bruce Broughton
 STV-81300 52 Pick-Up - Gary Chang
 STV-81301 Let's Get Harry - Brad Fiedel
 STV-81302 King Kong Lives - John Scott (Planned, confirmed but sold to MCA Records in late 1986 as confirmed by the official catalog number appearing in dead wax on MCA Records LP and is scratched out but is legible.)
 STV-81303 Firewalker - Gary Chang
 STV-81304 Lionheart: Volume 1 - Jerry Goldsmith
 STV-81305 Down Twisted - Berlin Game
 STV-81306 84 Charing Cross Road - George Fenton
 STV-81307 The Bedroom Window - Michael Shrieve / Patrick Gleeson
 STV-81308 The Kindred - David Newman
 STV-81309 From the Hip - Paul Zaza
 STV-81310 Death Before Dishonor - Brian May
 STV-81311 Lionheart: Volume Two - Jerry Goldsmith
 STV-81312 Amazing Grace and Chuck - Elmer Bernstein
 STV-81313 Evil Dead II - Joseph LoDuca
 STV-81314 A Nightmare on Elm Street 3: Dream Warriors - Angelo Badalamenti
 STV-81315 The Whistle Blower - John Scott
 STV-81317 Good Morning, Babylon - Nicola Piovani
 STV-81318 Raising Arizona / Blood Simple - Carter Burwell
 STV-81319 Three for the Road - Barry Goldberg
 STV-81320 Desperately Seeking Susan - Thomas Newman / Making Mr. Right - Chaz Jankel
 STV-81321 Capriccio - Riz Ortolani
 STV-81322 My Demon Lover - David Newman / Ed Alton
 STV-81324 House / House II: The Second Story - Harry Manfredini
 STV-81327 Julia and Julia - Maurice Jarre
 STV-81328 The Believers - J. Peter Robinson
 STV-81329 Hope and Glory - Peter Martin
 STV-81330 RoboCop - Basil Poledouris
 STV-81331 The Penitent - Alex North (Assigned a catalog number and cancelled. Tapes were lost/misplaced. Never released. Please see CD 47299 below for further information)
 STV-81333 Masters of the Universe - Bill Conti
 STV-81334 No Way Out - Maurice Jarre
 STV-81335 Russkies - James Newton Howard
 STV-81336 Nowhere to Hide - Brad Fiedel
 STV-81338 Housekeeping - Michael Gibbs
 STV-81339 Three O'Clock High - Tangerine Dream / Sylvester Levay / Jim Walker
 STV-81340 Prince of Darkness - John Carpenter, Alan Howarth
 STV-81341 The Dead / Journey into Fear - Alex North
 STV-81343 Man on Fire - John Scott
 STV-81344 Nightflyers - Doug Timm
 STV-81345 Near Dark - Tangerine Dream
 STV-81346 Tough Guys Don't Dance - Angelo Badalamenti
 STV-81347 The Whales of August - Alan Price
 STV-81348 Surrender - Michel Colombier
 STV-81349 The Hidden - Michael Convertino
 STV-81350 Weeds - Angelo Badalamenti
 STV-81352 No Man's Land - Basil Poledouris
 STV-81353 Anna - Greg Hawkes
 STV-81354 Five Corners - James Newton Howard
 STV-81355 Sister, Sister - Richard Einhorn
 STV-81356 The Running Man - Harold Faltermeyer
 STV-81357 Shy People - Tangerine Dream
 STV-81358 Flowers in the Attic - Christopher Young
 STV-81359 In a Shallow Grave - Jonathan Sheffer
 STV-81360 Noble House - Paul Chihara
 STV-81361 Prison - Richard Band / Christopher L. Stone
 STV-81362 The Serpent and the Rainbow - Brad Fiedel

704/1000 digital LP series (1979–1988)
Starting in the late 1970s, the label wanted to distinguish its digital LP releases from their standard edition LPs featuring a unique codex starting with either 1000 or 704 for their later issues. Most of these applied to their earlier classical releases but the label then tried to focus on their digital soundtrack recordings which were becoming standard during the mid-1980s. This series did not last until mid-1988 when the label officially joined MCA to distribute and release their soundtracks and future Broadway, jazz and vocal albums.

Also amongst this series was the DBX Recording Technology Showcase Series, which was the label's attempt in conjunction with the new technology of LPs played on a specialized no noise system making the music louder sonically with the dbx encoded LPs. Chalfont, Varèse's LP offshoot was amongst the group of record labels involved along with themselves personally. Their forte into this technology produced the album, Beyond the Sound Barrier: The Spectacular Sound of Digital DBX Discs, a compilation of digitally recorded tracks from the albums Digital Space by Morton Gould and Boy With Goldfish and Lazarus and His Beloved (Symphonic Suite from the Opera) by Lee Holdridge.

The soundtrack titles also corresponded in sequence to their CD releases also starting with the identical number or a different number than previously assigned. which were very scarce in production unlike the LPs which were more widely available. However, a few of these LPs did not have a CD counterpart and some were cancelled possibly due to the poor performances of the film theatrically. Examples of these are Bad Dreams and Dead Heat in which CD counterparts were announced and then cancelled just relegating them to LP and cassette releases only. Since these vinyl albums were not released with a suffix (i.e. STV, VSD, etc.) unlike the original classical releases (VCDM), VCDM has been added to avoid confusion between the 704 series CD as Varèse Sarabande Digital LP.

 RTS-2 Beyond the Sound Barrier: The Spectacular Sound of Digital DBX Discs - various artists / Morton Gould & Lee Holdridge, the London Symphony Orchestra
 VCDM-1000.10 Gould: Latin-American Symphonette - Morton Gould, the London Symphony Orchestra
 VCDM-1000.40 Withrow: Concerto for Violin and Orchestra No. 2 / Lazarus and His Beloved (Symphonic Suite from the Opera) - Lee Holdridge conductor, the London Symphony Orchestra
 VCDM-1000.60 Dvorak: The Devil's Trill, A Vaclav Hudecek Recital - Václav Hudeček, Josef Hála, Susumu Miyashita, Giuseppe Tartini, Pablo de Sarasate
 VCDM-1000.100 Vivaldi: The Four Seasons - Patrick Gleeson
 VCDM-1000.140 Tchaikovsky: Symphony No. 6 "Pathétique" - Enrique Batiz, the London Symphony Orchestra
 VCDM-1000.150 Rodrigo: Fantasía para un gentilhombre / Concierto Andaluz - Enrique Batiz, Orquesta Sinfónica del Estado de México
 VCDM-1000.190 Dvorak: Symphony No. 9 "From The New World" - Enrique Batiz, the London Symphony Orchestra
 VCDM 704.120 John Williams: Flute and Violin Concerto - Leonard Slatkin conductor, London Symphony Orchestra. (Mark Peskanov, violin soloist & Peter Lloyd, flute soloist)
 VCDM-704.130 Armenian Suite / Symphony No. 2 "Psalms" - Richard Yardumian / Varujan Kojian, Utah Symphony Orchestra, Lili Chookasian
 VCDM-704.200 Korngold: Sinfonietta for Large Orchestra, Op. 5 - Erich Wolfgang Korngold / Gerd Albrecht conductor, the Berlin Radio Symphony Orchestra
 VCDM-704.226 Music Of Miklos Rosza (Spellbound Concerto) - Miklos Rosza/ Elmer Bernstein cond. Dorothy Jonas & Joshua Pierce (Duo Piano) and Cynthia Millar, Ondes Martenot & the Utah Symphony Orchestra
 VCDM-704.250 Music from Alfred Hitchcock Films - John Williams / Dimitri Tiomkin / Franz Waxman / Roy Webb, Charles Ketchum, conductor & the Utah Symphony Orchestra
 VCDM-704.270 Star Trek: Volume One - Alexander Courage / Sol Kaplan / Fred Steiner (re-recording) (Fred Steiner conductor, the Royal Philharmonic Orchestra)
 VCDM-704.300 Star Trek: Volume Two - George Duning / Alexander Courage / Jerry Fielding / Fred Steiner (re-recording) (Fred Steiner conductor, the Royal Philharmonic Orchestra)
 VCDM-704.370 Pee-wee's Big Adventure / Back to School - Danny Elfman / John Coleman conductor (re-recording) (Recorded in London)
 VCDM-704.380 The Sea Hawk - Erich Wolfgang Korngold / Varujan Kojian conductor
 VCDM-704.390 Suspect - Michael Kamen
 VCDM-704.400 Wall Street / Salavador - Stewart Copeland / Georges Delerue
 VCDM-704.420 Zelly and Me - Pino Donaggio
 VCDM-704.430 Au revoir les enfants - Franz Schubert / Jean-François Heisser
 VCDM-704.440 Pass The Ammo - Carter Burwell (Planned for release, assigned a catalog number and cancelled)
 VCDM-704.450 Off Limits - James Newton Howard
 VCDM-704.470 White Mischief - George Fenton
 VCDM-704.510 Return to Snowy River - Bruce Rowland
 VCDM-704.520  Two Moon Junction - Jonathan Elias 
 VCDM-704.530  Lady In White - Frank LaLoggia
 VCDM-704.540 Dominick and Eugene - Trevor Jones
 VCDM-704.560 Bad Dreams - Jay Ferguson
 VCDM-704.570 Dead Heat - Ernest Troost
 VCDM-704.590 Stand and Deliver - Craig Safan
 VCDM-704.600 Eight Men Out - Mason Daring / various artists
 VCDM-704.610 D.O.A. - Chaz Jankel
 VCDM-704.620 Poltergeist III - Joe Renzetti
 VCDM-704.700 Betrayed - Bill Conti

5200 LP series (1988–1991)
After the label completed its deal with MCA Distributing, they continued to produced LPs of their soundtracks despite the fact that sales of vinyl were plummeting due to the successful emergence of the CD format which allowed for a more sonic experience as well as putting on more music on a CD more so than LP that could only hold approximately 45 minutes and barely more.

The label reassigned the number of their LPs to try and match their CD counterparts under the prefix of VSD (Varèse Sarabande Disc). The LPs were simply assigned (VS and followed by the catalog number). All LPs featured the exact same artwork as the CDs as well as musical content. However, not all of the CD releases had an LP counterpart which was largely due to reissues from other record labels such as Arista Records, MCA, Sony and others which were not produced by the label. Their releases concentrated on everything they produced and released by them which included hit films such as Die Hard 2, Total Recall, Back to the Future Part III, Terminator 2: Judgment Day and Ghost, which is one of the label's all-time best selling albums.

The final LPs produced by the label were in late 1991 when the label switched strictly to CDs and cassettes only. The thrilling action score, Ricochet composed by Academy Award nominee Alan Silvestri and featuring the hit title song by famed rapper Ice-T of Law & Order: Special Victims Unit was the final LP release on the label.

 VS-5201 Crossing Delancey - Paul Chihara / the Roches
 VS-5202 Bat-21 - Christopher Young
 VS-5203 A Nightmare on Elm Street 4: The Dream Master - Craig Safan (score album)
 VS-5204 Madame Sousatzka - Gerald Gouriet / various artists
 VS-5205 Halloween 4: The Return of Michael Myers - Alan Howarth
 VS-5208 Screen Themes - various artists / John Scott conducts (This is a hybrid album of re-recordings conducted by Scott for scores such as Die Hard, Big, Who Framed Roger Rabbit, Masquerade, Shoot To Kill and The Milagro Beanfield War with original tracks from Varèse soundtracks such as Cocoon: The Return, Criminal Law and Betrayed)
 VS-5209 Wisdom - Danny Elfman
 VS-5210 Criminal Law - Jerry Goldsmith
 VS-5211 Cocoon: The Return - James Horner
 VS-5215 Talk Radio / Wall Street - Stewart Copeland
 VS-5216 Farewell to the King - Basil Poledouris
 VS-5219 Three Fugitives - David McHugh
 VS-5220 The Fly II - Christopher Young
 VS-5223 Heathers - David Newman
 VS-5226 Leviathan - Jerry Goldsmith
 VS-5227 Pet Sematary - Elliot Goldenthal
 VS-5230 Red Scorpion - Jay Chattaway
 VS-5231 Cold Feet - Tom Bahler
 VS-5234 Ginger Ale Afternoon - Willie Dixon
 VS-5235 The Abyss - Alan Silvestri
 VS-5237 Wired - Michael Chiklis & The Wired Band / Basil Poledouris
 VS-5238 A Nightmare on Elm Street 5: The Dream Child - Jay Ferguson (score album)
 VS-5239 Halloween 5: The Revenge of Michael Myers - Alan Howarth
 VS-5240 Christine - John Carpenter / Alan Howarth
 VS-5244 My Left Foot / Da - Elmer Bernstein
 VS-5246 Driving Miss Daisy - Hans Zimmer / various artists
 VS-5248 Music Box - Philippe Sarde
 VS-5253 Enemies, A Love Story - Maurice Jarre
 VS-5254 Triumph of the Spirit - Cliff Eidelman
 VS-5255 Stanley & Iris - John Williams
 VS-5267 Total Recall - Jerry Goldsmith
 VS-5269 Gremlins 2: The New Batch - Jerry Goldsmith
 VS-5271 RoboCop 2 - Leonard Rosenman
 VS-5272 Back to the Future Part III - Alan Silvestri
 VS-5273 Die Hard 2: Die Harder - Michael Kamen
 VS-5274 After Dark, My Sweet - Maurice Jarre
 VS-5276 Ghost - Maurice Jarre
 VS-5280 Presumed Innocent - John Williams
 VS-5283 Hardware - Simon Boswell
 VS-5284 Desperate Hours - David Mansfield
 VS-5286 Pacific Heights - Hans Zimmer
 VS-5287 The Last Butterfly - Alex North / Milan Svoboda
 VS-5288 Miller's Crossing - Carter Burwell
 VS-5289 White Palace - George Fenton
 VS-5290 The Grifters - Elmer Bernstein
 VS-5291 Jacob's Ladder - Maurice Jarre
 VS-5292 The Field - Elmer Bernstein
 VS-5293 Memphis Belle - George Fenton
 VS-5294 Henry & June - Mark Adler / various artists
 VS-5299 Mr. Destiny - David Newman
 VS-5300 Welcome Home, Roxy Carmichael - Thomas Newman
 VS-5302 Predator 2 - Alan Silvestri
 VS-5303 Class Action - James Horner
 VS-5304 The Long Walk Home - George Fenton
 VS-5305 Kindergarten Cop - Randy Edelman
 VS-5306 Come See the Paradise - Randy Edelman / various artists
 VS-5307 Almost an Angel - Maurice Jarre
 VS-5308 Once Around - James Horner / various artists
 VS-5309 Green Card - Hans Zimmer
 VS-5310 Guilty by Suspicion - James Newton Howard / various artists
 VS-5312 Switch - Henry Mancini (score album)
 VS-5313 Oscar - Elmer Bernstein
 VS-5314 La Femme Nikita - Éric Serra
 VS-5315 The Hard Way - Arthur B. Rubinstein
 VS-5317 Out for Justice - David Michael Frank / various artists
 VS-5318 Omen IV: The Awakening - Jonathan Sheffer
 VS-5321 City Slickers - Marc Shaiman / various artists
 VS-5322 Soapdish - Alan Silvestri
 VS-5323 Hudson Hawk - Michael Kamen & Robert Kraft / various artists
 VS-5324 Only the Lonely - Maurice Jarre / various artists
 VS-5325 A Rage in Harlem - Elmer Bernstein
 VS-5326 Crossing the Line (aka The Big Man, European title) - Ennio Morricone
 VS-5330 Pure Luck - Jonathan Sheffer / Danny Elfman
 VS-5331 The Naked Gun / The Naked Gun 2½: The Smell of Fear - Ira Newborn
 VS-5332 Doc Hollywood - Carter Burwell / various artists
 VS-5333 Freddy's Dead: The Final Nightmare - Brian May (score album)
 VS-5334 Mobsters - Michael Small
 VS-5335 Terminator 2: Judgment Day - Brad Fiedel
 VS-5336 Dutch - Alan Silvestri / various artists (assigned a number, planned for release and cancelled)
 VS-5337 Body Parts - Loek Dikker
 VS-5338 Hot Shots! - Sylvester Levay
 VS-5339 Dead Again - Patrick Doyle
 VS-5343 Little Man Tate - Mark Isham
 VS-5344 Ricochet - Alan Silvestri (The song "Ricochet" performed by Ice-T) (The last vinyl LP produced by the label)

47000 series (1983–1987) 
Varèse Sarabande first began producing compact discs roughly around 1983, almost at the very beginning of the dawn of the compact disc which also included labels such as GRP Records, Telarc, Mobile Fidelity and Polydor. Their initial releases in this series are often held in high regard by collectors, especially those without a barcode which all discs were printed and produced in Japan by the Japan Victor Company (JVC). These discs feature exceptional sound quality and in particular, the classical releases feature exceptional artwork which have made these titles extremely valuable. The first few years saw their first run of CDs pressed in Japan for US market by JVC beginning with 47201 which is the best selling Star Wars Trilogy CD until 47275 with Peggy Sue Got Married and then the label switched over to Laser Video for its releases starting with Tai-Pan (VCD-47274) in late 1986 until its final distributed release for that company with No Way Out (VCD-47301) in 1987. After that, the label's releases were exclusively pressed by JVC America.

This series was supervised and started by Tom Null, who supervised the classical releases along with the soundtracks with co-producer Chris Kuchler and then Richard Kraft came on board around 1986 and co-ran the label with Null until the end of 1988 to ease the label's transition after they reached a deal with MCA Distributing in 1987 which didn't take full effect until mid-1988. Null would remain with the label until 1993 where he would eventually reactivate Citadel Records, which was formerly a subsidiary of the label for a period of time reissued many of Varèse's LP and out of print Varèse CDs. Under new producer Robert Townson, who had released three titles during this period which included his first ever release as producer, The Final Conflict in 1986 under his label, Masters Film Music from Canada along with Lionheart, a little-seen adventure film which was released by the label in two separate volumes of music in 1987. Townson would take over and oversee the label in early 1989 after Kraft's departure.

This series was notorious for many catalog number gaps especially during late 1986 and the entirety of 1987, which many speculate were titles that were released as LP and cassette during this period. One such title, King Kong Lives was actually produced by the label but acquired by MCA Records in late 1986 as the film was figured to be a big holiday release late that year and was released through them instead. Some titles that were released theatrically during this period, did receive a CD counterpart to go along with the LP and cassette formats (i.e. Aliens, The Fly, Link, Enemy Mine, etc.) and others would either slated to be released as a CD and were cancelled would be reissued later on by the label through the Varèse Sarabande Club or in some cases as part of the regular catalog (i.e. Vamp, Firewalker, 52 Pick-Up, F/X, etc.).

Townson with the help of Kraft and Null would go on to start a Limited Edition Club of mail order only releases that would finally come to fruition during the spring of 1989 after being promoted in late 1987 and throughout 1988 after long delays. The club was intended for titles for new or older scores for past films that were released that did not receive a soundtrack release or a score album while the film was released theatrically and would later include many titles from the many gaps in their CD discography decades later. Townson's label, Masters Film Music, would get the first releases which included reissues which consisted of Obsession, Bernard Herrmann Concert Suites an elaborate four-disc reissue set of the original Decca LPs featuring stunning artwork and was a full-fledged production and Jerry Goldsmith Suites and Themes, the first live concert performance on CD by the famed Oscar winning composer which also featured equally stunning artwork as the other releases by the late Bob Peak. The official club titles started by Kraft and Null would soon be released not long after with Cherry 2000 by the late Basil Poledouris, which at one point was the most valuable soundtrack on the market, going for as much as $2500 at a hotly contested auction. Null would leave Varèse in 1993 and start his own label Citadel Records and reissued a lot of Varèse's older out-of-print soundtrack LPs, as well as some of the classical releases he released during his time with the label. Also during this period, Varese reached an agreement with Columbia House under the Columbia Record Club to release a handful classical releases that included Scheherazade, The Four Seasons and Dvořák Symphony No. 9 in E Minor, Op. 95 amongst others. The album covers had different color fonts and on the back insert and CD had the Columbia Record Club moniker "CRC on it to distinguish itself from the original Varese produced editions.

The Star Wars Trilogy, The Man from Snowy River, Halloween and Witness are amongst the label's all-time top ten best selling releases from this period along with other titles such as The Emerald Forest, Escape from New York, Aliens, The Fly, The Right Stuff/North and South, Pee-wee's Big Adventure / Back to School, Starman and The Road Warrior. Many of these titles stayed in print for at least two decades or more and others quickly went out of print.

The very last title produced by the label for this run, The Serpent and the Rainbow (VCD-47362) was one of the rarest titles in this series due to its low print run of an estimated 400 copies. This title was probably caught under the label's transition with MCA Distributing and was barely released throughout the country. For this reason, this title was very valuable for a long period of time and was recently reissued as part of Varèse's Little Box of Horrors 12-CD collection in 2016 in an LP replica styled slipcase featuring the same artwork as the original CD. This also goes for the label's strange handling of reissues of Phantasm, Liquid Sky and Dawn of the Dead which also were supposed to be released during or after the MCA transition and received very limited runs and also became collectors items as a result of this.

 VSD-47105 Phantasm - Fred Myrow / Malcolm Seagrave (planned for a US release; a small limited number of CDs were released in Europe)
 VCD-47106 Dawn of the Dead - Goblin (planned for a US release a small limited number of CDs were released)
 VCD-47144 Mad Max - Brian May
 VCD-47148 Dressed to Kill - Pino Donaggio
 VCD-47152 Halloween II - John Carpenter / Alan Howarth
 VCD-47180 The Winds of War - Bob Cobert
 VCD-47181 Liquid Sky - Slava Tsukerman / Brenda I. Hutchinson / Clive Smith
 VCD-47201 Star Wars Trilogy - John Williams / Varujan Kojian conductor the Utah Symphony Orchestra
 VCD-47202 The Adventures of Robin Hood - Erich Wolfgang Korngold / Varujan Kojian conductor the Utah Symphony Orchestra
 VCD-47203 Kings Row - Erich Wolfgang Korngold / Charles Gerhardt conductor National Philharmonic Orchestra (Also released as Andante ACD-805707 with the same contents)
 VCD-47204 The Empire Strikes Back - John Williams / Charles Gerhardt conductor National Philharmonic Orchestra (reissued as VSD-5353)
 VCD-47205 North by Northwest - Bernard Herrmann / Laurie Johnson conducts, the London Studio Orchestra (First pressing of CD was a digital recording which is stated on the booklet as a "digital recording". However, later pressings utilized the analog tape sources due to problems with the original digital recording. The digital recording notation was deleted from all future pressings)
 VCD-47206 Camelot (1982 OCR starring Richard Harris) - Alan Jay Lerner & Frederick Loewe
 VCD-47207 Liszt: Symphony No.2 "Dante" - Varujan Kojian & the Utah Symphony Orchestra
 VCD-47208 Scheherazade / Russian & Ludmilla Overture - Rimsky-Korsakov / Glinka, Loris Tjeknavorian & the London Symphony Orchestra (One of a handful of titles licensed to Columbia Record Club. The album cover features the title under a blue font instead of the regular Varese edition which is red.)
 VCD-47209 Morton Gould Conducts Works by Ravel, Shostakovich, Weinberger, Granados, Turina & Ginastera - Morton Gould
 VCD-47210 Enrique Bátiz Conducts Music of Spain, Volume One: Manuel de Falla: Nights in the Gardens of Spain / The Three Cornered Hat (complete ballet) - Eva Maria Zuk (piano), Maria Luisa Salinas (soprano), Enrique Batiz Orquesta Sinfónica del Estado de México
 VCD4-7211 Aaron Copland: Saga of the Prairies, An Outdoor Overture / Samuel Barber: Capricorn Concerto, First Essay for Orchestra / Charles Ives: Overture from the Third Orchestral Set - the Pacific Symphony Orchestra, Keith Clark (Also released as Andante ACD-85705 with the same contents)
 VCD-47212 The Four Seasons - Antonio Vivaldi / Patrick Gleeson (synthesizers) (First "digital to digital" recording of a digital synthesizer without microphones from 1980. Omits the first movement of "Winter" without explanation) (One of a handful of titles licensed to Columbia Record Club. The album cover features the title under a black font lettering instead of the regular Varese edition which is orange and red.)
 VCD-47213  - Tōru Takemitsu & the Tokyo Gagaku Orchestra
 VCD-47214 Sinfonietta For Large Orchestra Opus 5 - Erich Wolfgang Korngold / Gerd Albrecht conducts (Later reissued as VSD-5311)
 VCD-47215 Brainstorm - James Horner
 VCD-47216 Symphony No. 9 in E Minor, Op. 95 "From the New World"; Carnival Overture, Op. 92 - Antonín Dvořák / Enrique Batiz & the London Philharmonic Orchestra (One of a handful of titles licensed to Columbia Record Club.)
 VCD-47217 The Man from Snowy River - Bruce Rowland
 VCD-47218 Supergirl - Jerry Goldsmith (Features the orchestral score only without the synthesizer overdubs. Later issued by Silva Screen Records with the overdubs)
 VCD-47219 Enrique Bátiz Conducts Music of Spain, Volume Two: Rodrigo/Fantasia Para Un Gentilhombre/Concierto Andaluz/Falla/El Amor Brujo (complete) - Enrique Bátiz, Orquesta Sinfónica del Estado de México
 VCD-47220 Starman - Jack Nitzsche
 VCD-47221 Runaway - Jerry Goldsmith
 VCD-47222 The Year of Living Dangerously - Maurice Jarre
 VCD-47223 Wavelength - Tangerine Dream
 VCD-47224 Escape from New York - John Carpenter / Alan Howarth
 VCD-47225 Music from Alfred Hitchcock Films - John Williams / Dimitri Tiomkin / Franz Waxman / Roy Webb, Charles Ketchum, conductor & the Utah Symphony Orchestra
 VCD-47226 The World, the Flesh and the Devil / New England Concerto / Because of Him / Spellbound Concerto - Miklós Rózsa / Elmer Bernstein conductor featuring Dorothy Jonas & Joshua Pierce duo piano soloists and Cynthia Millar on ondes Martenot
 VCD-47227 Witness - Maurice Jarre
 VCD-47228 Mahler Symphony No. 4 - Gustav Mahler / Bruno Walter conductor & the Vienna Philharmonic, Irmgard Seefried (soprano)
 VCD-47229 Digital Space - Morton Gould & the London Symphony Orchestra (First ever "all-digital" LP recording in 1978)
 VCD-47230 Halloween - John Carpenter
 VCD-47231 The Secret of NIMH - Jerry Goldsmith (later reissued as VSD-5541)
 VCD-47232 Symphony No. 3 in C Minor, Op. 78 "Organ"; "Fingal's Cave" ("The Hebrides") Concert Overture, Op. 26 - Camille Saint-Saëns / Felix Mendelssohn, Loris Tjeknavorian
 VCD-47233 The Best of Twilight Zone: Volume One - various artists
 VCD-47234 Rambo: First Blood Part II - Jerry Goldsmith
 VCD-47235 Star Trek: Volume One - Alexander Courage / Sol Kaplan / Fred Steiner (re-recording) (Fred Steiner conductor, the Royal Philharmonic Orchestra)
 VCD-47236 John Wayne Westerns: Volume One: The Comancheros & True Grit - Elmer Bernstein & the Utah Symphony Orchestra
 VCD-47237 Morton Gould Conducts His Latin American Symphonette - Morton Gould & the London Symphony Orchestra
 VCD-47238 The Blue Max - Jerry Goldsmith
 VCD-47239 Menotti / Barber Violin Concertos - Ruggiero Ricci / Keith Clark & the Pacific Symphony Orchestra
 VCD-47240 Star Trek: Volume Two - George Duning / Alexander Courage / Jerry Fielding / Fred Steiner (re-recording) (Fred Steiner conductor, the Royal Philharmonic Orchestra)
 VCD-47241 The Black Cauldron - Elmer Bernstein (re-recording) the Utah Symphony Orchestra
 VCD-47242 The Final Conflict - Jerry Goldsmith (First official release of "Masters Film Music" label which would be associated with Varèse Sarabande starting in 1986)
 VCD-47243 Winter. Marginalia. Gitimalya. - Tōru Takemitsu / Hiroyuki Iwaki conductor Tokyo Metropolitan Symphony Orchestra
 VCD-47244 The Film Music of Lee Holdridge - Lee Holdridge / Charles Gerhardt conductor the London Symphony Orchestra
 VCD-47245 Symphony No. 6 "Gettysburg" / Copland: The Emily Dickinson Songs - Roy Harris / Marni Nixon, Keith Clark & the Pacific Symphony Orchestra
 VCD-47246 Spies Like Us - Elmer Bernstein
 VCD-47247 The Best of Twilight Zone: Volume Two - various artists
 VCD-47248 Toward the Unknown Region, Fantasia on a Theme by Tallis / Five Variants on "Dives and Lazarus" / Norfolk Rhapsody No. 1 - Ralph Vaughan Williams / Norman Del Mar conductor
 VCD-47249 Enemy Mine - Maurice Jarre
 VCD-47250 The Right Stuff / North and South (re-recording) - Bill Conti & the London Symphony Orchestra
 VCD-47251 The Emerald Forest - Junior Homrich / Brian Gascoigne
 VCD-47252 The Clan of the Cave Bear - Alan Silvestri
 VCD-47253 Orchestral Space - Seiji Ozawa & Yomiuri Nippon Symphony
 VCD-47254 The Ghost and Mrs. Muir - Bernard Herrmann / Elmer Bernstein conductor (Reissue of Bernstein's LP from 1975 under his "Film Music Collection" limited edition LP banner)
 VCD-47255 A Nightmare on Elm Street - Charles Bernstein / A Nightmare on Elm Street 2: Freddy's Revenge - Christopher Young (A double bill CD featuring the first scores of the famed and popular horror series. Released under the moniker A Nightmare on Elm Street 1 & 2. Both scores were released individually on LP and cassette by the label)
 VCD-47256 The 7th Voyage of Sinbad - Bernard Herrmann
 VCD-47257 Villa Lobos Conducts Villa Lobos: Choros No. 6 & Bachianas Brasileiras No. 7 - Heitor Villa-Lobos conductor
 VCD-47258 The Jungle Book / The Thief of Bagdad - Miklós Rózsa (re-recording) the Nuremberg Symphony Orchestra
 VCD-47259 Stone Flower: Symphonic Suite of Waltzes / Gypsy Fantasia / Symphony in Three Movements - Stravinsky, the Vienna Philharmonic, Wilhelm Furtwängler, Sergei Prokofiev, Hans Schwieger, the Kansas City Philharmonic
 VCD-47260 Gorky Park - James Horner
 VCD-47261 The Hunger - Michel Rubini & Denny Jaeger / various artists
 VCD-47262 The Road Warrior (Mad Max 2) - Brian May
 VCD-47263 Aliens - James Horner
 VCD-47264 John Wayne Westerns: Volume Two: Big Jake, Cahill & The Shootist - Elmer Bernstein & the Utah Symphony Orchestra
 VCD-47265 Roman Polanski's Pirates - Philippe Sarde (CD contains more music than LP release)
 VCD-47266 Poltergeist II: The Other Side - Jerry Goldsmith (Colosseum Europe release with CDs pressed by JVC Japan in the early days and later in Europe. Produced and released in US by Intrada Records)
 VCD-47267 The Fog - John Carpenter
 VCD-47268 Ben-Hur / El Cid / King of Kings - Miklós Rózsa / Richard Mullen-Lampertz conducts, Hamburg Concert Orchestra and Chorus
 VCD-47269 Knights of the Round Table / Lydia - Miklós Rózsa
 VCD-47270 The Avengers: The Television and Movie Music of Laurie Johnson - Laurie Johnson & the London Symphony Orchestra
 VCD-47271 The Seven Samurai / Rashomon - Fumio Hayasaka
 VCD-47272 The Fly - Howard Shore (CD contains more music than LP release)
 VCD-47273 Where the River Runs Black - James Horner
 VCD-47274 Tai-Pan - Maurice Jarre (The first "Laser Video" pressed CD for the label instead of JVC Japan)
 VCD-47275 Peggy Sue Got Married - John Barry / various artists
 VCD-47276 Link - Jerry Goldsmith
 VCD-47277 Blue Velvet - Angelo Badalamenti
 VCD-47278 Crimes of the Heart - Georges Delerue
 VCD-47279 The Boy Who Could Fly - Bruce Broughton (re-recording) (Recorded in London)
 VCD-47281 Pee-wee's Big Adventure / Back to School - Danny Elfman / John Coleman conductor (re-recording) (Recorded in London)
 VCD-47282 Lionheart: Volume One - Jerry Goldsmith
 VCD-47283 Crocodile Dundee - Peter Best (Original first pressing features an error in the insert which lists "26 tracks" instead of 12 tracks which became the US release. Soundtrack was issued in Europe by Silva Screen Records with 26 tracks)
 VCD-47284 Raising Arizona / Blood Simple - Carter Burwell
 VCD-47285 Amazing Grace and Chuck - Elmer Bernstein
 VSD-47286 Raw Deal - Cinemascore (1992 Colosseum Europe only pressing reissued in the US as VSD-5519)
 VCD-47288 Lionheart: Volume Two - Jerry Goldsmith
 VCD-47290 Hope and Glory - Peter Martin
 VCD-47291 Desperately Seeking Susan - Thomas Newman / Making Mr. Right - Chaz Jankel
 VCD-47293 A Nightmare on Elm Street 3: Dream Warriors - Angelo Badalamenti (score album)
 VCD-47295 House / House II: The Second Story - Harry Manfredini
 VCD-47298 RoboCop - Basil Poledouris
 VCD-47299 The Penitent - Alex North (planned, assigned a catalog number and cancelled. Tapes are presumed lost currently)
 VCD-47300 Masters of the Universe - Bill Conti
 VCD-47301 No Way Out - Maurice Jarre (The very last "Laser Video" pressed CD before JVC America took over and pressed CDs for the label starting from this point)
 VCD-47304 The Sea Hawk - Erich Wolfgang Korngold / Varujan Kojian conductor
 VCD-47307 Three O'Clock High - Tangerine Dream / Sylvester Levay
 VCD-47308 Housekeeping - Michael Gibbs
 VCD-47309 Near Dark - Tangerine Dream
 VCD-47310 Prince of Darkness - John Carpenter / Alan Howarth
 VCD-47311 The Whales of August - Alan Price
 VCD-47312 Surrender - Michel Colombier
 VCD-47313 Weeds - Angelo Badalamenti
 VCD-47314 Man on Fire - John Scott
 VCD-47315 Suspect - Michael Kamen
 VCD-47327 Julia and Julia - Maurice Jarre
 VCD-47341 The Dead / Journey into Fear - Alex North
 VCD-47349 The Hidden - Michael Convertino
 VCD-47352 No Man's Land - Basil Poledouris
 VCD-47354 5 Corners - James Newton Howard
 VCD-47356 The Running Man - Harold Faltermeyer
 VCD-47357 Shy People - Tangerine Dream
 VCD-47360 Noble House - Paul Chihara
 VCD-47362 The Serpent and the Rainbow - Brad Fiedel (One of the first titles released under Varèse Sarabande's new distribution deal with MCA. The small run of the CD was released (about 400 copies exist) and erroneously adds a track that is not on any of the CD, LP and cassette releases. This mistake was later corrected in its reissue contained in The Little Box of Horrors box set in 2016. A definitive release was just released in March 2021. Please see Varèse Club section below)

70400 series (1988)
This batch of a dozen titles between the 47000 series and the new mainline series starting from 5200 to 7500 series which started right after this after Varèse's newly minted distribution deal with MCA (aka UNI later on Universal Music Group (UMG)) in late 1987 which the label finally instituted a barcode system which included this series of titles which had a limited press run of over 500 copies or more during the label's transition with MCA into their distribution cycle. This numbering system stems from their digital LP series of titles featuring a few soundtracks (i.e. Suspect) and also could be seen as 470 rearranged as 704. These titles featured specific lettering and package design not unlike the 47000 series and this lettering and package design would run until the first batch of the 5200 series, which would later reinstitute the font lettering they used during the 47000 series permanently until 1999.

This series features a few cancellations including one rumored title of Dead Heat by Ernest Troost and one confirmed but announced title, Bad Dreams in which collectors were willing to pay top prices for until the label revealed and confirmed its cancellation when they finally released it on CD as part of their LP to CD Subscription Series that ran from June 2015 to May 2016.

 VCD-70440 Wall Street / Salvador - Stewart Copeland / Georges Delerue
 VCD-70442 Zelly and Me - Pino Donaggio
 VCD-70443 Au revoir les enfants - Franz Schubert / Jean-François Heisser
 VCD-70445 Off Limits - James Newton Howard
 VCD-70446 Mozart: Symphony No. 31 & 36 - Wolfgang Amadeus Mozart / Enrique Batiz conductor (Released through Columbia House CD Club. CD label and back insert cites "CRC" initials. Possible exclusive release through them)
 VCD-70446 Sherlock Holmes - Patrick Gowers (This is the correct intended catalog number for this release but was delayed and later released as VSD-5221 but all discs contain this catalog number on the label side because it was never corrected since the disc was manufactured in France by MPO along with the preceding title, White Mischief. Originally released in Europe by That's Entertainment Records (TER) and licensed to the US with the disc was manufactured in France by MPO with Varèse Sarabande's labeling on the CD)
 VCD-70447 White Mischief - George Fenton (Originally released in Europe by That's Entertainment Records (TER) and licensed to the US with the disc was manufactured in France by MPO with Varèse Sarabande's labeling on the label side)
 VCD-70451 Return to Snowy River - Bruce Rowland
 VCD-70452 Two Moon Junction - Jonathan Elias (Released on LP and announced on CD but ultimately cancelled without explanation. Released in 1994 as VSD-5518)
 VCD-70453 Lady In White - Frank LaLoggia (Released on LP and announced on CD but ultimately cancelled without explanation. Released by East West Records in Europe in 1997 and expanded by Intrada Records around 2018)
 VCD-70454 Dominick and Eugene - Trevor Jones
 VCD-70456 Bad Dreams - Jay Ferguson (announced, assigned a catalog number and cancelled. Finally released as part of Varèse Sarabande's LP-to-CD Subscription Series)
 VCD-70457 Dead Heat - Ernest Troost (announced, assigned a catalog number and cancelled. Available on LP and cassette only)
 VCD-70459 Stand and Deliver - Craig Safan
 VCD-70460 Eight Men Out - Mason Daring / various artists
 VCD-70461 D.O.A. - Chaz Jankel
 VCD-70462 Poltergeist III - Joe Renzetti
 VCD-70470 Betrayed - Bill Conti

5200–7500 series (1988–2018)
When Varèse Sarabande began its partnership with MCA Distribution in 1988, the benefits of this deal were nationwide availability of Varèse Sarabande CDs, LPs and cassettes. The label adopted the MCA catalog numbering system with the prefix VSD (which stood for Varèse Sarabande Disc and VSC for Varèse Sarabande cassette) and a subsequent number to denote multiple-disc sets (VSD2, VSD3, etc.) or a video release (VSV) if any as that was required for all labels in the MCA distribution system. When the MCA and PolyGram families merged in 1999, which created Universal Music, the newly merged company used PolyGram's catalog-numbering system, which used the main six digits of the UPC barcode (numbers 5 through 10 in the standard 12-number UPC set) as the basis for the catalog number and since the original MCA numbering was already based on part of the UPC number (specifically digits 7 through 10), the number sequence was not changed. This run starting from VSD-5200 ended during the 7500 series as Concord Records assumed control of the company during the middle of 2018 and started a new numbering system as a result. Catalogue numbers without a title are usually assigned to a release that is not ready to be officially announced by the label. In some cases, older unassigned numbers are the result of a production delay, but usually it is because they have been canceled. For collectors, the curiosity of knowing what a number has been assigned to is part of the demand for a complete discography.

Also as Varèse Sarabande grew, it branched into other musical venues and imprints including Varèse Spotlight, which focused on original cast recordings; Varèse Jazz, which focused on jazz interpretations featuring the Trotter Trio and others; Varèse Vintage, which re-issued all genres of oldies; Water Music, which specialized in electronica; Fuel 2000, which focused on popular music; and Wildcat, which focused on rock recordings. All divisions share the same catalog numbering system, but only the Varèse Sarabande, Spotlight, and Vintage imprints share the same number sequence. There have also been some soundtracks released as digital download titles that are not currently on CD at the moment.

Colosseum Records, which is featured here as well on this listing, was the label's international division located in Nuremberg, Germany, which released all US soundtrack releases as well as European films that were able to release under their banner. Like the US versions of these soundtracks, the German pressings featured the same artwork, but instead of the black JVC design on the label side, they feature a silver label side with the JVC design in red. The artwork also featured "LC" which stood for a Colosseum version. The label released titles that were only available through imports that were not released here and many of those titles featured numbers to what were cancelled releases to movies here in the US. (i.e. John Carpenter's Greatest Hits VSD-5336 / Dutch VSD-5336 US, Evil Dead VSD-5362 / Rock-a-Doodle VSD-5362 US). They also released titles for US films that did not receive a US equivalent which included Dust Devil by Simon Boswell, The Evil Dead by Joseph LoDuca, Goodbye Bafana by Dario Marianelli and a few more. They also kept in print many of the out of print 47000 and 70400 series titles for a long period of time which included D.O.A., Poltergeist III, Cocoon: The Return, John Carpenter's The Fog, The Thief of Baghdad / The Jungle Book, and Lionheart: Volumes 1 & 2. The label would later close in 2015 and Varèse does not have a European distributor at the moment.

Robert Townson, who produced his first title which was The Final Conflict aka Omen III under his Masters Film Music label in conjunction with the label in 1986, took over in early 1989 and oversaw the label's growth into one of the greatest soundtrack labels in the world with a yearly output of approximately 50 titles from newly released films, restorations and reissues from other labels which started with reissues of Sony LP titles (i.e. The Chase, The Lion in Winter, The Guns of Navarone, etc.) in 1989, then reissuing many titles from the MCA catalog (i.e. MacArthur, Ghost Story, Dracula, etc.) starting in 1990 which lasted until 2001 along with Arista Records (i.e. Close Encounters of the Third Kind, Taxi Driver, The Fury, etc.), the Decca catalog (i.e. The Robe, Airport, Anastasia, etc.), Bay Cities in 1997 (i.e. 1941, The Private Lives of Elizabeth and Essex, etc.) and reissues from their LP catalog that appeared as regular releases (i.e. Lifeforce, The Manhattan Project, Videodrome, etc.) and as Soundtrack Club releases (i.e. F/X: The Deluxe Edition, Eye of the Needle, Last Embrace, Vamp, Silver Bullet, etc.). He also created a re-recording program which brought new audiences to older soundtrack recordings from composers who he had worked with personally on the label which included John Williams, Jerry Goldsmith, John Barry, Alex North, Elmer Bernstein, Alan Silvestri, Stu Phillips and James Horner (i.e. Midway, Body Heat, To Kill a Mockingbird, Patton, Who's Afraid of Virginia Woolf?, etc.) as well as produce new and complete re-recording of scores by Golden Age composers such as Bernard Herrmann, Franz Waxman and Miklós Rózsa (i.e. Psycho, Vertigo, Sunset Boulevard, etc.). The first and, more importantly, his first re-recording of a film score was a historic event in that it was for Alex North's rejected score for Stanley Kubrick's sci-fi classic, 2001: A Space Odyssey which the famed director completely threw out. Conducting the event was North's best friend and Oscar-winning composer Jerry Goldsmith with his favorite orchestra, the National Philharmonic of London with North's wife, Abby present during the recording. Before this event took place, no one outside of North or Goldsmith had heard this seemingly lost score until North's passing in late 1991 and this project came to light. His most important release was Spartacus by his favorite composer Alex North whom he was finally able to release his epic score (his personal all-time favorite) in 2010 to commemorate the film's 50th anniversary with an elaborate six-CD set. Coming in a close second and surprisingly one of the best-selling soundtracks of all-time in 1990 was the Oscar winning film, Ghost, which featured a score by Oscar winner Maurice Jarre and more importantly, the hit song "Unchained Melody" sung by the Righteous Brothers which Alex North co-wrote and was featured in North's full orchestral composition in the film. The album sold over one million copies. Townson left the label in late 2018 after Concord Music bought the label to concentrate on live concerts throughout the U.S. and Europe.

Bruce Kimmel, who was asked to be a part of the label when it started in 1978 which was intended to be solely for classical music and reissues of older Golden Age soundtracks that were really successful, released two soundtracks to films he had personally worked on The First Nudie Musical and Stages, joined the label in 1993 after a successful run at the then defunct Bay Cities soundtrack label and much like Robert Townson for soundtracks, he was given the full responsibility of the Broadway Musical, Spotlight and Jazz imprints of the label. These divisions were dedicated to releasing or reissuing soundtracks to musicals that were performing on and off Broadway, which was a huge success for the label throughout the 1990s as they dominated the marketplace with stellar releases with many being best sellers and featured favorable reviews. Kimmel also showcased performers from these shows on the Varèse Spotlight banner which included the late Michelle Nicastro, Christiane Noll, Judy Kaye, Paige O'Hara, Mary Cleere Haran, Liz Callaway and many others. Kimmel also produced a few compilations dedicated to film music as well such as the Ennio Morricone jazz ensemble album Once Upon a Time in Cinema, Toonful and its sequel, Toonful Too dedicated to popular Disney songs performed by Nicastro, and also dedicated himself to jazz as well with the label's Varèse Jazz imprint that featured wonderful recordings by the Terry Trotter Trio producing albums inspired by movies, artists and Broadway shows by Stephen Sondheim. These include The Star Wars Album, The Michel Legrand Album, Follies, Passion... in Jazz and many others. He also produced two of accomplished jazz pianist Fred Hersch's albums for the label I Never Told You: Fred Hersch Plays the Music of Johnny Mandel and a popular collaboration between Hersch and jazz singer Janis Siegel entitled Slow Hot Wind. Sadly, his divisions were closed down by 2001 by the label as the company was no longer interested in producing or releasing Broadway or jazz releases at that point in time. He would leave to work with Fynsworth Alley, a label dedicated to Broadway and off-Broadway theater shows as well as vocals just as they had been doing at Varèse Sarabande in 2000, which ended abruptly in late 2001 as he and the label had completely different visions. Kimmel would later form his own label, Kritzerland Records which is dedicated to movie soundtracks, musicals and some jazz albums in the late 2000s.

The biggest curiosity of this series is the aborted release of the score album to that 1993 Bound By Honor which was originally titled Blood In Blood Out. This soundtrack which was publicly announced at the time of the films' release, and abruptly cancelled because of Disney's last-minute decision to change the films' title due to a test screening that led to violence along with the turmoil going on in Los Angeles at time. The label was about part way through the run (an unspecified number of these CDs were produced) when the change was made. Proving it would be too costly to reprint and produce another run of CDs under the films' new title, the CD was never officially released despite its announcements in the film, the film's advertising and subsequent video releases along with the song laden soundtrack album released by Hollywood Records at the same time. This was an officially produced album that was never released but a number of copies of it have surfaced around Hollywood insiders and throughout the soundtrack community and has been dubbed The Caine Mutiny of soundtrack CDs due to its rarity. This title has recently appeared on eBay as a counterfeit (bootleg) which features the same contents. However, the disc itself was not officially pressed by JVC America as the official Varese release and the inner ring features more silver in the center which is not on the original JVC pressing. The artwork is a color copy of the original with the exception of the lettering on the bottom in reference to the VSD-5396 catalog number which the font is incorrect on the booklet and it also omits liner notes by the films' writer Jimmy Santiago Baca and the films' director Taylor Hackford which is featured inside the booklet. The original release also featured a butterfly silver foiled holographic sticker on the jewel case like all Varese Sarabande titles as well as all Universal Music Group distributed titles during this period of time.

The very last "official" title released under the old Varese numerical system that had started in mid to late 1988 was Jeff Beal's score to the Rob Reiner film "Shock And Awe".

 VSD-5201 Crossing Delancey - Paul Chihara / the Roches
 VSD-5202 Bat-21 - Christopher Young
 VSD-5203 A Nightmare on Elm Street 4: The Dream Master - Craig Safan (score album)
 VSD-5204 Madame Sousatzka - Gerald Gouriet / various artists
 VSD-5205 Halloween 4: The Return of Michael Myers - Alan Howarth
 VSD-5206 Miklos Rozsa: Hollywood Legend - Elmer Bernstein conducts
 VSD-5207 The Prince and the Pauper and Other Themes - Charles Gerhardt conducts
 VSD-5208 Screen Themes - various artists / John Scott conducts (This is a hybrid album of re-recordings conducted by Scott for scores such as Die Hard, Big, Who Framed Roger Rabbit, Masquerade, Shoot to Kill and The Milagro Beanfield War with original tracks from Varèse soundtracks such as Cocoon: The Return, Criminal Law and Betrayed)
 VSD-5209 Wisdom - Danny Elfman
 VSD-5210 Criminal Law - Jerry Goldsmith
 VSD-5211 Cocoon: The Return - James Horner
 VSD-5212 The Spirit of St. Louis - Franz Waxman
 VSD-5213 The Bridge on the River Kwai - Malcolm Arnold
 VSD-5214 The Buccaneer - Elmer Bernstein
 VSD-5215 Talk Radio / Wall Street - Stewart Copeland
 VSD-5216 Farewell to the King - Basil Poledouris
 VSD-5217 The Lion in Winter - John Barry
 VSD-5218 The Quiller Memorandum - John Barry
 VSD-5219 Three Fugitives - David McHugh
 VSD-5220 The Fly II - Christopher Young
 VSD-5221 Sherlock Holmes - Patrick Gowers (Originally intended to be released as VCD-704446 and the first press run of this title was pressed under this number co-assigned with Mozart symphonies 31 & 36 which was also released under this number in this series. Later pressings of this disc have the updated and corrected number on the disc itself as VSD-5221)
 VSD-5222 Is Paris Burning? - Maurice Jarre
 VSD-5223 Heathers - David Newman
 VSD-5224 The Alamo - Dimitri Tiomkin
 VSD-5225 War and Peace - Nino Rota
 VSD-5226 Leviathan - Jerry Goldsmith
 VSD-5227 Pet Sematary - Elliot Goldenthal
 VSD-5228 The Fall of the Roman Empire - Dimitri Tiomkin
 VSD-5229 The Chase - John Barry
 VSD-5230 Red Scorpion - Jay Chattaway
 VSD-5231 Cold Feet - Tom Bahler
 VSD-5232 The Old Man and the Sea - Dimitri Tiomkin
 VSD-5233 55 Days at Peking - Dimitri Tiomkin
 VSD-5234 Ginger Ale Afternoon - Willie Dixon
 VSD-5235 The Abyss - Alan Silvestri
 VSD-5236 The Guns of Navarone - Dimitri Tiomkin
 VSD-5237 Wired - Michael Chiklis & the Wired Band / Basil Poledouris
 VSD-5238 A Nightmare on Elm Street 5: The Dream Child - Jay Ferguson (score album)
 VSD-5239 Halloween 5: The Revenge of Michael Myers - Alan Howarth
 VSD-5240 Christine - John Carpenter / Alan Howarth
 VSD-5241 Georges Delerue: The London Sessions: Volume One - Georges Delerue (re-recording with some original tracks. Georges Delerue conductor. Frank Fitzpatrick additional conductor. Featuring Carl Anderson and Eileen Clark, vocals. Recorded in May 1989)
 VSD-5242 Franz Waxman: Legends of Hollywood: Volume 1 - Franz Waxman / Richard Mills conducts
 VSD-5243 Season of the Witch - John Carpenter / Alan Howarth
 VSD-5244 My Left Foot / Da - Elmer Bernstein
 VSD-5245 Georges Delerue: The London Sessions: Volume Two - Georges Delerue (re-recording with some original tracks. Georges Delerue conductor. Frank Fitzpatrick additional conductor. Recorded in May 1989. Features non re-recorded suite for An Almost Perfect Affair)
 VSD-5246 Driving Miss Daisy - Hans Zimmer / various artists
 VSD-5247 Shocker - William Goldstein (score album) (The film's box office failure prevented a planned wide release by MCA distribution and made it an instant collectable. The back insert of the CD in later pressings has the MCA distribution information erased with a black Sharpie as evidence of this)
 VSD-5248 Music Box - Philippe Sarde
 VSD-5249 Masada - Jerry Goldsmith
 VSD-5250 Dracula - John Williams
 VSD-5251 Firestarter - Tangerine Dream
 VSD-5252 Psycho II - Jerry Goldsmith
 VSD-5253 Enemies, A Love Story - Maurice Jarre
 VSD-5254 Triumph of the Spirit - Cliff Eidelman
 VSD-5255 Stanley & Iris - John Williams
 VSD-5256 Georges Delerue: The London Sessions: Volume Three - Georges Delerue (re-recording with some original tracks. Georges Delerue conductor. Frank Fitzpatrick additional conductor. Features non recorded suites for True Confessions Recorded in May 1989)
 VSD-5257 Franz Waxman: Legends of Hollywood: Volume 2 - Franz Waxman / Richard Mills conducts
 VSD-5258 The Egyptian - Alfred Newman / Bernard Herrmann
 VSD-5259 Ghost Story - Philippe Sarde
 VSD-5260 MacArthur - Jerry Goldsmith
 VSD-5261 Explorers - Jerry Goldsmith
 VSD-5262 Earthquake - John Williams
 VSD-5263 Lawrence of Arabia - Maurice Jarre
 VSD-5264 The Fury - John Williams
 VSD-5265 Casino Royale  - Burt Bacharach
 VSD-5266 John Carpenter's Greatest Hits: Volume 1 - John Carpenter (Colosseum Europe only release)
 VSD-5267 Total Recall - Jerry Goldsmith
 VSD-5268 Forbidden Zone - Danny Elfman / Oingo Boingo
 VSD-5269 Gremlins 2: The New Batch - Jerry Goldsmith
 VSD-5270 Dead Poets Society / The Mosquito Coast / Witness / The Year of Living Dangerously - Maurice Jarre
 VSD-5271 RoboCop 2 - Leonard Rosenman
 VSD-5272 Back to the Future Part III - Alan Silvestri
 VSD-5273 Die Hard 2: Die Harder - Michael Kamen
 VSD-5274 After Dark, My Sweet - Maurice Jarre
 VSD-5275 Close Encounters of the Third Kind - John Williams (Features the "disco version of CETK theme" originally issued as a LP single by Arista Records)
 VSD-5276 Ghost - Maurice Jarre
 VSD-5277 The Eiger Sanction - John Williams
 VSD-5278 The Thing - Ennio Morricone
 VSD-5279 Taxi Driver - Bernard Herrmann / Dave Blume (Half of the album is part of the late Herrmann's original score as featured in the film. The other is jazz arrangements of Herrmann's themes from the film conducted by Dave Blume. This is a straight reissue of the original Arista Records LP)
 VSD-5280 Presumed Innocent - John Williams
 VSD-5281 The Omen - Jerry Goldsmith (Reissue of Academy Award winning score featuring content as the Fox Records LP from 1976)
 VSD-5282 The Final Conflict - Jerry Goldsmith (Reissue of the original Masters Film Music 1986 release through the label VCD-47242 featuring the same contents)
 VSD-5283 Hardware - Simon Boswell
 VSD-5284 Desperate Hours - David Mansfield
 VSD-5285 Anthony Adverse (re-recording) - Erich Wolfgang Korngold / John Scott conducts
 VSD-5286 Pacific Heights - Hans Zimmer
 VSD-5287 The Last Butterfly - Alex North / Milan Svoboda (additional music)
 VSD-5288 Miller's Crossing - Carter Burwell
 VSD-5289 White Palace - George Fenton
 VSD-5290 The Grifters - Elmer Bernstein / Cynthia Millar (additional music)
 VSD-5291 Jacob's Ladder - Maurice Jarre
 VSD-5292 The Field - Elmer Bernstein
 VSD-5293 Memphis Belle - George Fenton
 VSD-5294 Henry & June - Mark Adler / various artists
 VSD-5295 The Robe - Alfred Newman
 VSD-5296 Torn Curtain - John Addison
 VSD-5297 The Sound and the Fury - Alex North
 VSD-5298 The River - John Williams
 VSD-5299 Mr. Destiny - David Newman
 VSD-5300 Welcome Home, Roxy Carmichael - Thomas Newman
 VSD-5301 Hollywood Soundstage: Big Movie Hits: Volume One - various artists
 VSD-5302 Predator 2 - Alan Silvestri
 VSD-5303 Class Action - James Horner
 VSD-5304 The Long Walk Home - George Fenton
 VSD-5305 Kindergarten Cop - Randy Edelman
 VSD-5306 Come See the Paradise - Randy Edelman / various artists
 VSD-5307 Almost an Angel - Maurice Jarre
 VSD-5308 Once Around - James Horner / various artists
 VSD-5309 Green Card - Hans Zimmer
 VSD-5310 Guilty by Suspicion - James Newton Howard / various artists
 VSD-5311 Sinfonietta for Large Orchestra Opus 5 - Erich Wolfgang Korngold / Gerd Albrecht conducts
 VSD-5312 Switch - Henry Mancini (score album)
 VSD-5313 Oscar - Elmer Bernstein
 VSD-5314 La Femme Nikita - Éric Serra
 VSD-5315 The Hard Way - Arthur B. Rubinstein
 VSD-5316 Love Field - Jerry Goldsmith
 VSD-5317 Out for Justice - David Michael Frank / various artists
 VSD-5318 Omen IV: The Awakening - Jonathan Sheffer
 VSD2-5319 Seville Film Music Concerts - Maurice Jarre / José Nieto (Live concert that took place in Seville, Spain, in 1989 featuring film themes from both composers)
 VSD-5320 Lifeforce - Henry Mancini
 VSD-5321 City Slickers - Marc Shaiman / various artists
 VSD-5322 Soapdish - Alan Silvestri
 VSD-5323 Hudson Hawk - Michael Kamen & Robert Kraft / various artists
 VSD-5324 Only the Lonely - Maurice Jarre / various artists
 VSD-5325 A Rage in Harlem - Elmer Bernstein
 VSD-5326 Crossing the Line - Ennio Morricone (This film was released in Europe under the title "The Big Man")
 VSD-5327 Dark Star - John Carpenter (Colosseum Records European release, was not released in the US)
 VSD-5328 Jaws 2 - John Williams
 VSD-5329 Symphonic Hollywood - Lee Holdridge / Miklós Rózsa / Richard Kaufman conducts
 VSD-5330 Pure Luck - Jonathan Sheffer / Danny Elfman
 VSD-5331 The Naked Gun / The Naked Gun 2½: The Smell of Fear - Ira Newborn
 VSD-5332 Doc Hollywood - Carter Burwell / various artists
 VSD-5333 Freddy's Dead: The Final Nightmare - Brian May (score album)
 VSD-5334 Mobsters - Michael Small
 VSD-5335 Terminator 2: Judgment Day - Brad Fiedel
 VSD-5336 Greatest Hits: Volume 2 - John Carpenter (Colosseum Records European release, was not released in the US)
 VSD-5336 Dutch - Alan Silvestri / various artists (assigned a number, planned for release and cancelled)
 VSD-5337 Body Parts - Loek Dikker
 VSD-5338 Hot Shots! - Sylvester Levay
 VSD-5339 Dead Again - Patrick Doyle
 VSD-5340 The Dark Half - Christopher Young
 VSD-5341 Highway to Hollywood: Big Movie Hits: Volume Two - Various Artists
 VSD-5343 Little Man Tate - Mark Isham
 VSD-5344 Ricochet - Alan Silvestri (The song "Ricochet" performed by Ice-T)
 VSD-5345 Violin Concerto & Flute Concerto - John Williams / Leonard Slatkin conducts
 VSD-5346 Symphony in F-sharp Opus 40 - Erich Wolfgang Korngold / Rudolf Kempe conducts
 VSD-5347 Storyville - Carter Burwell
 VSD-5348 Father of the Bride - Alan Silvestri (Featuring songs by Steve Tyrell)
 VSD-5349 Black Robe - Georges Delerue
 VSD-5350 Medicine Man - Jerry Goldsmith
 VSD-5351 Hollywood Chronicle: Great Movie Classics: Volume One - various artists
 VSD-5352 Article 99 - Danny Elfman
 VSD-5353 The Empire Strikes Back - John Williams / Charles Gerhardt conducts (reissue of VCD 47204)
 VSD-5354 K2 - Hans Zimmer (This soundtrack is for the European version of the film that is longer with the US version featuring a replacement score by Chaz Jankel not featured here. The CD features two covers. The US edition features a painting by Matthew Joseph Peak and the European edition features the original film poster and stills from the film for its artwork. Coincidentally, the first pressing of this disc in the US has the European poster art and later repressed with Peak's artwork)
 VSD-5355 Memoirs of an Invisible Man - Shirley Walker
 VSD-5356 Final Analysis - George Fenton
 VSD-5357 Death in Venice - various artists
 VSD 5357 Bed & Breakfast - David Shire (This release looks like a regular Varèse Sarabande release with a brown spine, logo and the inner ring of the CD contains an assigned VSD number which is 5357. A production issue arose as two titles were assigned the same number and this title was released with XCD-1008 as part of their Colossal Records series. May have been assigned the number first and Death In Venice may have been intended to be VSD-5358 but the pressing error caused the change for this title)
 VSD-5359 The Great Mouse Detective - Henry Mancini
 VSD-5360 Basic Instinct - Jerry Goldsmith
 VSD-5361 Hollywood Backlot: Big Movie Hits: Volume Three - various artists
 VSD-5362 Evil Dead - Joseph LoDuca (Colosseum only release, not released in the US)
 VSD-5362 Rock-a-Doodle - Robert Folk / T.J. Kunstler (assigned a number, planned for release and cancelled. Released in Germany)
 VSD-5363 Nightmare Cafe - J. Peter Robinson / various artists
 VSD-5364 My Cousin Vinny - Randy Edelman
 VSD-5365 Year of the Comet - Hummie Mann
 VSD-5366 The Player - Thomas Newman
 VSD-5367 A Little Romance - Georges Delerue
 VSD-5368 Agnes of God - Georges Delerue
 VSD-5369 Man Trouble - Georges Delerue
 VSD-5370 Rich in Love - Georges Delerue
 VSD-5371 Of Mice and Men - Mark Isham
 VSD-5372 The Linguini Incident - Thomas Newman / various artists
 VSD-5373 Universal Soldier - Christopher Franke
 VSD-5374 The Public Eye - Mark Isham
 VSD-5375 Death Becomes Her - Alan Silvestri
 VSD-5376 Sketch Artist - Mark Isham
 VSD-5377 Johnny Guitar - Victor Young
 VSD-5378 Rio Grande - Victor Young / Sons of the Pioneers
 VSD-5379 Diggstown - James Newton Howard
 VSD-5380 Unforgiven - Lennie Niehaus / Clint Eastwood
 VSD-5381 The Young Indiana Jones Chronicles: Volume One - Laurence Rosenthal / Joel McNeely
 VSD-5382 Cool World - Mark Isham
 VSD-5383 Mr. Baseball - Jerry Goldsmith
 VSD-5384 Nails - Bill Conti
 VSD-5385 Mom and Dad Save the World - Jerry Goldsmith
 VSD-5386 Breaking the Rules - Hidden Faces / David Kitay
 VSD-5387 Film Classics - various artists (Colosseum only release, not released in the US)
 VSD-5387 Whispers in the Dark - Thomas Newman (assigned a number, planned for release and cancelled)
 VSD-5388 Rapid Fire - Christopher Young
 VSD-5389 Christopher Columbus: The Discovery - Cliff Eidelman
 VSD-5390 Conan the Barbarian - Basil Poledouris
 VSD-5391 The Young Indiana Jones Chronicles: Volume Two - Laurence Rosenthal / Joel McNeely
 VSD-5392 Conan the Destroyer - Basil Poledouris
 VSD-5393 New Music for Films: Volume One - Christopher Franke
 VSD-5394 The Lover - Gabriel Yared
 VSD-5395 Dust Devil - Simon Boswell (Colosseum only release) (Some releases of the CD omit the track titles on the back insert)
 VSD-5396 Blood In Blood Out (Bound by Honor) - Bill Conti (A full run of this soundtrack was pressed and some copies have leaked into the marketplace. Legal issues arose after Disney changed the film's title and the run was withdrawn after it had been prepared for release)
 VSD-5397 Indochine - Patrick Doyle
 VSD-5398 Arnold: Great Music from His Films - various artists
 VSD-5399 The London Concert - Christopher Franke
 VSD-5400 2001: A Space Odyssey (The Unused Score) - Alex North / Jerry Goldsmith conducts
 VSD-5401 The Young Indiana Jones Chronicles: Volume Three - Laurence Rosenthal / Joel McNeely
 VSD-5402 The Distinguished Gentleman - Randy Edelman
 VSD2-5403 The Young Lions / This Earth Is Mine - Hugo Friedhofer
 VSD-5404 Untamed Heart - Cliff Eidelman
 VSD-5405 Lust for Life / Background to Violence Suite (The Killers / Brute Force / Naked City) - Miklós Rózsa
 VSD-5406 Damage - Zbigniew Preisner
 VSD-5407 Themes From Classic Sci-Fi, Fantasy & Horror Films - various artists / Dick Jacobs conducts
 VSD-5408 Matinee - Jerry Goldsmith
 VSD-5409 Under Siege - Gary Chang
 VSD-5410 The Temp - Frédéric Talgorn
 VSD-5411 Army of Darkness - Joseph LoDuca (Featuring the "March of the Dead" theme composed by Danny Elfman)
 VSD-5412 The Cemetery Club - Elmer Bernstein
 VSD-5413 Orlando - David Motion / Sally Potter
 VSD-5414 Touch of Evil - Henry Mancini
 VSD-5415 Mad Dog and Glory - Elmer Bernstein
 VSD-5416 RoboCop 3 - Basil Poledouris
 VSD-5417 Fire in the Sky - Mark Isham
 VSD-5418 The Adventures of Huck Finn - Bill Conti
 VSD-5419 Lost in Yonkers - Elmer Bernstein
 VSD-5420 Othello - Angelo Francesco Lavagnino / Alberto Bargeris conducts
 VSD-5421 The Young Indiana Jones Chronicles: Volume Four - Laurence Rosenthal / Joel McNeely
 VSD-5422 Anastasia - Alfred Newman
 VSD-5423 Rich Man, Poor Man - Alex North
 VSD-5424 Equinox - various artists
 VSD-5425 King of the Hill - Cliff Martinez / various artists
 VSD-5426 Hot Shots! Part Deux - Basil Poledouris
 VSD-5427 Freddy's Favorites: The Best of A Nightmare on Elm Street - Charles Bernstein / Christopher Young / Angelo Badalamenti / Craig Safan / Jay Ferguson / Brian May (Compilation that features music from all of the Nightmare on Elm Street films up that point. Each composer is represented with a few tracks apiece)
 VSD-5432 Josh and S.A.M. - Thomas Newman / various artists
 VSD-5433 Unsung Sondheim - Stephen Sondheim
 VSD-5434 Anywhere I Wander: Liz Callaway Sings Frank Loesser - Liz Callaway
 VSD-5435 M. Butterfly - Howard Shore
 VSD-5436 Airport - Alfred Newman
 VSD-5437 Toonful - Michelle Nicastro
 VSD-5438 Needful Things - Patrick Doyle
 VSD-5439 Prettybelle (1993 original cast starring Angela Lansbury) - Bob Merrill & Jule Styne
 VSD-5440 Bring Back Birdie (1993 original cast) - Charles Strouse & Lee Adams
 VSD-5441 A Norman Rockwell Christmas - Pacific Chorale / All-American Boys Chorus
 VSD-5442 Malice - Jerry Goldsmith
 VSD-5443 The Secret Garden - Zbigniew Preisner
 VSD-5444 The Saint of Fort Washington - James Newton Howard
 VSD-5445 Hard Target - Graeme Revell featuring Kodō
 VSD-5446 Rudy - Jerry Goldsmith
 VSD-5447 Demolition Man - Elliot Goldenthal (score album)
 VSD-5448 Body Bags - John Carpenter / Jim Lang
 VSD-5449 And the Band Played On - Carter Burwell
 VSD-5450 The Real McCoy - Brad Fiedel
 VSD-5451 The Secret Garden (1993 world premiere cast recording) - Alfred Shaughnessy & Sharon Burgess
 VSD-5452 Part of Your World: Debbie Shapiro Gravitte Sings Alan Menken - Debbie Shapiro Gravitte
 VSD-5453 Sugar Babies (1993 OCR starring Mickey Rooney & Ann Miller) - Jimmy McHugh & Dorothy Fields
 VSD-5454 Farewell My Concubine - Zhao Jiping
 VSD-5455 Once Upon a Time in China: Volume One - various artists
 VSD-5456 Younger and Younger - Hans Zimmer / Alex Wurman
 VSD-5457 The Wedding Banquet - Mader
 VSD-5458 20 All-Time Movie Hits Video Hit Collection '93 - various artists (Colosseum Records release, not released in US)
 VSD-5458 The Good Son - Elmer Bernstein (assigned a number, planned for release and cancelled. Subsequently, released by Fox Movie Scores)
 VSD-5459 Wall Street / Talk Radio - Stewart Copeland (Reissue of VSD-5215)
 VSD-5460 Flesh and Bone - Thomas Newman / various artists
 VSD-5461 Lucky Stiff (1993 OCR) - Stephen Flaherty & Lynn Ahrens
 VSD-5462 Unsung Musicals - various artists
 VSD-5463 Carlito's Way - Patrick Doyle (score album)
 VSD-5464 She Loves Me (1993 OCR) - Jerry Bock & Sheldon Harnick
 VSD-5465 Addams Family Values - Marc Shaiman (score album)
 VSD-5466 Timon of Athens (1963 original theatrical score) - Duke Ellington / Stanley Silverman conducts
 VSD-5467 Iron Will - Joel McNeely
 VSD-5468 On Deadly Ground - Basil Poledouris
 VSD-5469 Angie - Jerry Goldsmith
 VSD-5470 Golden Gate - Elliot Goldenthal
 VSD-5471 Mrs. Parker and the Vicious Circle - Mark Isham
 VSD-5472 Just in Time: Judy Kuhn Sings Jule Styne - Judy Kuhn
 VSD-5473 Collette Collage: 2 Musicals About Collette (1993 OCR) - Harvey Schmidt & Tom Jones
 VSD-5474 I'll Do Anything - Hans Zimmer
 VSD-5474 Mother's Boys - George S. Clinton (assigned a number, planned for release and cancelled)
 VSD-5475 Lost in Boston (Rejected songs from major musicals) - various artists
 VSD-5476 Ruthless! The Musical - Joel Paley/Marvin Laird
 VSD-5477 The Hudsucker Proxy - Carter Burwell
 VSD-5478 Wipe Out! The Best of the Surfaris - the Surfaris
 VSD-5479 Being Human - Michael Gibbs
 VSD-5480 Franz Waxman: Legends of Hollywood: Volume 3 - Richard Mills conducts
 VSD-5481 The Surfing Songbook - Rincon Surfside Band
 VSD-5482 This Heart of Mine - Mary Cleere Haran
 VSD-5483 No Escape - Graeme Revell
 VSD-5484 Lionheart - Jerry Goldsmith (Severely condensed version of both Lionheart volumes 1 & 2 albums with some music from both volumes omitted)
 VSD-5485 Lost in Boston II (More rejected songs from major musicals) - various artists
 VSD-5486 A Celebration of Soul: Volume One - various artists
 VSD-5487 Widows' Peak - Carl Davis
 VSD-5488 Kinky Friedman - Kinky Friedman
 VSD-5489 A Group Called Smith - Smith
 VSD-5490 From a Girl's Point of View - Love Unlimited
 VSD-5491 Pipeline - the Chantays
 VSD-5492 I Love You - Eddie Holman
 VSD-5493 Bend Me, Shape Me: The Best of the American Breed - the American Breed
 VSD-5494 A Celebration of Soul: Volume Two - various artists
 VSD-5495 Leprechaun 2 - Jonathan Elias
 VSD-5496 The Stand - W. G. Snuffy Walden
 VSD-5497 Samson and Delilah / The Quiet Man - Victor Young
 VSD-5498 Hans Christian Andersen / The Court Jester - Danny Kaye
 VSD-5499 The Crow - Graeme Revell (score album)
 VSD-5500 A Streetcar Named Desire - Alex North / Jerry Goldsmith conducts (re-recording)
 VSD-5501 The Avengers: The Television and Movie Music of Laurie Johnson (reissue) - Laurie Johnson
 VSD-5502 Renaissance Man - Hans Zimmer
 VSD-5503 All Rock 'N' Roll Oldies: Volume One - L. A. Version (KCBS) - various artists
 VSD-5505 All Rock 'N' Roll Oldies: Volume One - L. A. Version (WARW) - various artists
 VSD-5506 All Rock 'N' Roll Oldies: Volume One - L. A. Version (KRRW) - various artists
 VSD-5510 I Love Trouble - David Newman
 VSD-5511 Where Were You When I Needed You - the Grass Roots
 VSD-5512 The Road to Wellville - Rachel Portman / various artists
 VSD-5514 Ain't It the Truth: The Best of Mary Wells 1964-1982 - Mary Wells
 VSD-5515 Nothing Can Stop Me: Gene Chandler's Greatest Hits - Gene Chandler
 VSD-5516  Rodgers & Hammerstein's A Grand Night for Singing (1994 OCR) - Richard Rodgers & Oscar Hammerstein II
 VSD-5517 A Broadway Christmas - various artists
 VSD-5518 Two Moon Junction - Jonathan Elias
 VSD-5519 Raw Deal - Cinemascore
 VSD-5520 The Epoch Collection - Rupert Holmes
 VSD-5521 Beyond the Blue Horizon: More of the Best of Lou Christie - Lou Christie
 VSD-5522 More Greatest Hits - Pat Boone
 VSD-5523 Dark Moon: The Best of Gale Storm - Gale Storm
 VSD-5524 P.S. I Love You: The Best of the Hilltoppers - the Hilltoppers featuring Jimmy Sacca
 VSD-5525 Melody of Love: The Best of Billy Vaughn - Billy Vaughn
 VSD-5526 Hearts of Stone: The Best of the Fontane Sisters - the Fontane Sisters
 VSD-5527 Heartbeats (1994 OCR) - Amanda McBroom
 VSD-5528 Eat Drink Man Woman - Mader
 VSD-5529 Our Private World: Sally Mayes Sings Comden & Green - Sally Mayes
 VSD-5530 Days of Wine & Roses: The Classic Songs of Henry Mancini - Michael Lang
 VSD-5531 Hollywood '94 - various artists / Joel McNeely conducts, Seattle Symphony Orchestra
 VSD-5532 Timecop - Mark Isham
 VSD-5533 Wagon's East! - Michael Small
 VSD-5534 Rhythm of the Rain - various artists
 VSD-5535 Bubblegum Classics: Volume One - various artists
 VSD-5536 The War Lord - Jerome Moross
 VSD-5537 Reel Imagination - Michelle Nicastro
 VSD-5538 A Simple Twist of Fate - Cliff Eidelman
 VSD-5539 Laughter in the Rain: The Best of Neil Sedaka - Neil Sedaka
 VSD-5540 The Cowboys - John Williams
 VSD-5541 The Secret of NIMH - Jerry Goldsmith (Reissue of original release by label VCD-47231 with new artwork and the album tracks resequenced)
 VSD-5542 The Best Little Whorehouse Goes Public (1994 OCR) - Carol Hall
 VSD-5543 Exotica - Mychael Danna
 VSD-5544 Princess Caraboo - Richard Hartley
 VSD-5545 Widescreen - Rupert Holmes
 VSD-5546 Terminal Velocity - Joel McNeely
 VSD-5547 I Never Told You: Fred Hersch Plays the Music of Johnny Mandel - Fred Hersch
 VSD-5548 Merrily We Roll Along (1994 OCR) - Stephen Sondheim
 VSD-5549 Tuneweaver - Neil Sedaka
 VSD-5550 The Christmas Touch - Johnny Tillotson
 VSD-5551 Fahrenheit 451 - Bernard Herrmann / Joel McNeely conducts, Seattle Symphony Orchestra
 VSD-5552 Slow, Hot Wind - Fred Hersch / Janis Siegel
 VSD-5553 Exit to Eden - Patrick Doyle
 VSD-5554 War of the Buttons - Rachel Portman
 VSD-5555 Trapped in Paradise - Robert Folk
 VSD-5556 Passion... in Jazz - Stephen Sondheim / the Trotter Trio
 VSD-5557 Hello, Dolly! (1994 30th-anniversary original cast recording starring Carol Channing) - Jerry Herman
 VSD-5558 Junior - James Newton Howard
 VSD-5559 Souvenirs de Voyage / Echoes - Bernard Herrmann (Reissue of Bay Cities release)
 VSD-5560 Street Fighter - Graeme Revell (score album)
 VSD-5561 Blood & Thunder: Hollywood's Most Famous Epics - Cliff Eidelman conducts
 VSD-5562 Sax and Violence: Music from the Dark Side of the Screen - various artists / Lanny Meyers conductor / performer
 VSD-5563 Lost In Boston III (Even more rejected songs from major musicals) - various artists
 VSD-5564 Unsung Musicals II - various artists
 VSD-5565 SeaQuest DSV - John Debney
 VSD-5566 The Best of Ed Bruce - Ed Bruce
 VSD-5567 The Best of Donna Fargo - Donna Fargo
 VSD-5568 The Best of Joe Stampley - Joe Stampley
 VSD-5569 More Greatest Hits - Gene Pitney
 VSD-5570 Poetry in Motion: The Best of Johnny Tillotson - Johnny Tillotson
 VSD-5572 So You Are a Star: The Best of the Hudson Brothers - the Hudson Brothers
 VSD-5573 Lone Wolf McQuade - Francesco De Masi
 VSD-5574 Help Me Make It Through the Night: The Best of Sammi Smith - Sammi Smith
 VSD-5575 Bubblegum Classics: Volume Two - various artists
 VSD-5576 The Best of Dick & Dee Dee - Dick St. John & Dee Dee Sperling
 VSD-5577 The Best of Fabian - Fabian
 VSD-5578 The History of Cadence Records: Volume One - various artists
 VSD-5579 The History of Cadence Records: Volume Two - various artists
 VSD-5580 Last Boogie in Paris - Johnny Rivers & His L. A. Boogie Band
 VSD-5581 Drop Zone - Hans Zimmer
 VSD-5582 Richie Rich - Alan Silvestri
 VSD-5583 The Andrew Lloyd Webber Album - Laurie Beechman
 VSD-5584 This Funny World: Mary Cleere Haran Sings Lyrics by Hart - Mary Cleere Haran
 VSD-5585 The Story Goes On: On & Off Broadway - Liz Callaway
 VSD-5586 Loving You: Paige O'Hara Sings Jerry Herman - Paige O'Hara
 VSD-5587 The Underneath - Cliff Martinez / various artists
 VSD-5588 Surfaris Stomp - the Surfaris
 VSD-5589 Diva by Diva: Legendary Ladies of Broadway - Judy Kaye
 VSD-5590 Teen Suite: Best of 1958-1962 - Jan & Dean
 VSD-5591 Listen, Listen: The Best of Emitt Rhodes - Emitt Rhodes
 VSD-5592 Sweet and Lovely: The Best of Nino Tempo & April Stevens - Nino Tempo & April Stevens
 VSD-5593 Das Barbecü (1995 original cast) - Scott Warrender / Jim Luigs
 VSD-5594 The Best of Frankie Avalon - Frankie Avalon
 VSD-5595 The Quick and the Dead - Alan Silvestri
 VSD-5596 Just Cause - James Newton Howard
 VSD-5597 The Mystery of Edwin Drood (1995 OCR) - Rupert Holmes
 VSD-5598 Sentimental Me: The Best of the Ames Brothers - the Ames Brothers
 VSD-5599 Outbreak - James Newton Howard
 VSD-5600 Vertigo - Bernard Herrmann / Joel McNeely conducts (re-recording) the Royal Scottish National Orchestra
 VSD-5601 Citizen X - Randy Edelman
 VSD-5602 Dolores Claiborne - Danny Elfman
 VSD-5603 Stephen Sondheim's Sweeney Todd in Jazz - Stephen Sondheim / the Trotter Trio
 VSD-5604 Radio Gals (1995 OCR) - Mike Craver & Mark Hardwick
 VSD-5605 Country Hits Through the Years: The '50s - various artists
 VSD-5606 Country Hits Through the Years: The '60s - various artists
 VSD-5607 Country Hits Through the Years: The '70s - various artists
 VSD-5608  Roy Clark Greatest Hits - Roy Clark
 VSD-5609  B.J.Thomas More Greatest Hits - B.J. Thomas
 VSD-5610 Blue Lady: The Nashville Sessions - Petula Clark
 VSD-5611 Jealous Kind of Fella - Garland Green
 VSD-5612 Drums! Drums! A-Go-Go - Hal Blaine
 VSD-5613 Mr. Spock's Music from Outer Space - Leonard Nimoy
 VSD-5614 The Transformed Man - William Shatner
 VSD-5615 The Best of Terri Gibbs - Terri Gibbs
 VSD-5616 Music! Music! Music!: The Best of Teresa Brewer - Teresa Brewer
 VSD-5617  The Four Aces More Greatest Hits - the Four Aces
 VSD-5618 Treat Her Right: The Best of Roy Head - Roy Head
 VSD-5619 There'll Come a Time - Betty Everett
 VSD-5620 A Pyromaniac's Love Story / Great Moments in Aviation / Smoke / Ethan Frome - Rachel Portman
 VSD-5621 A Hollywood Christmas - various artists
 VSD-5622 Shakespeare on Broadway - various artists
 VSD-5623 No One is Alone: Songs of Inspiration and Hope from Broadway - Laurie Beechman
 VSD-5624 Cinemotions - various artists
 VSD-5625 1976 Concert in Japan - Micky Dolenz, Davy Jones, Tommy Boyce & Bobby Hart
 VSD-5626 Love Me With All Your Heart - Ray Charles with the Ray Charles Singers
 VSD-5627 While You Were Sleeping - Randy Edelman
 VSD-5628 A Little Princess - Patrick Doyle
 VSD-5629 Village of the Damned - John Carpenter / Dave Davies
 VSD-5630 Once Upon a Time in the Cinema - Ennio Morricone / Lanny Meyers conducts
 VSD-5631 Henry, Sweet Henry (1967 OCR starring Don Ameche) - Bob Merrill
 VSD2-5632 Unsung Irving Berlin - various artists
 VSD-5633 Gold Diggers: The Secret of Bear Mountain - Joel McNeely
 VSD-5634 Not of This Earth!: The Film Music of Ronald Stein - Ronald Stein
 VSD-5635 Arrow 93FM All Rock & Roll Oldies - Volume Two - various artists
 VSD-5636 Persuasive Percussion - Terry Snyder and his All-Stars / Enoch Light
 VSD-5637 Provocative Percussion - the Command All-Stars / Enoch Light
 VSD-5638 On the Waterfront: On Broadway (1995 cast recording) - David Amram
 VSD-5639 Jazz Goes to Hollywood: The Sixties - various artists / Fred Karlin conducts
 VSD-5640 Toonful, Too - Michelle Nicastro
 VSD-5641 Voyages: The Film Music Journeys of Alan Silvestri - Alan Silvestri (Featuring the debut of music from Romancing the Stone which was unreleased at the time)
 VSD-5642 Chapter 8 - Chapter 8 featuring Anita Baker
 VSD-5643 Whispering Bill: The Greatest Hits of Bill Anderson - Bill Anderson
 VSD-5644 I Like Your Kind of Love: The Cadence Sessions - Andy Williams
 VSD-5645 Legend - Tangerine Dream / Bryan Ferry, Jon Anderson (songs)
 VSD-5646 To Die For - Danny Elfman
 VSD-5647 Anything Goes: Rebecca Luker Sings Cole Porter - Rebecca Luker
 VSD-5648 Under Siege 2: Dark Territory - Basil Poledouris ("After the Train is Gone" performed by actor Steven Seagal)
 VSD-5649 Jeffery - Stephen Endelman / various artists
 VSD-5650 Lost Civilizations - Joe Delia (This was music for the ten hour NBC Series which was announced, assigned catalog number and then cancelled. Released as an agency promotional CD for the composer)
 VSD-5651 Picture Bride - Cliff Eidelman (Rejected score for 1995 film featuring artwork by Matthew Joseph Peak)
 VSD-5652 Doing Something Right: Randy Graff Sings Cy Coleman - Randy Graff
 VSD-5653 Arrow 95.7 Rock & Roll Classics - various artists
 VSD-5655 All Rock and Roll Oldies: Volume 2 - various artists
 VSD-5656 Arrow 93.7 FM Rock & Roll Classics - various artists
 VSD-5658 Cliffhangers! Music from Republic Films - James King conducts
 VSD-5659 Magic in the Water - David Schwartz
 VSD-5660 Hercules: The Legendary Journeys - Joseph LoDuca
 VSD-5661 Babe - Nigel Westlake / various artists
 VSD-5662 The Net - Mark Isham
 VSD-5663 Sudden Death - John Debney
 VSD-5664 Something to Talk About - Hans Zimmer / Graham Preskett
 VSD-5665 Ethel Merman's Broadway (1995 OCR starring Rita McKenzie) - various artists
 VSD-5666 Shoot'Em Ups! Music from Republic Serials - James King conducts
 VSD-5667 The Stars Fell on Henrietta - David Benoit
 VSD-5668 Spirit in the Sky: The Best of Norman Greenbaum - Norman Greenbaum
 VSD-5669 Forbidden Hollywood (1995 original cast) Gerard Alessandrini
 VSD-5670 Words & Music: Songs of Tommy Boyce & Bobby Hart - Tommy Boyce & Bobby Hart
 VSD-5671 Hollywood '95 - various artists / Joel McNeely conducts
 VSD-5672 Mighty Morphin Power Rangers: The Movie - Graeme Revell (score album)
 VSD-5673 Company... in Jazz - Stephen Sondheim / the Trotter Trio
 VSD-5674 The Adjuster / Speaking Parts / Family Viewing - Mychael Danna
 VSD-5675 Now and Then - Cliff Eidelman (score album)
 VSD-5676 Broadway Bound: New Writers For Musical Theatre - various artists
 VSD-5677 Chinatown - Jerry Goldsmith
 VSD-5678 Halloween: The Curse of Michael Myers - Alan Howarth
 VSD-5679 Frankie Starlight - Elmer Bernstein
 VSD-5680 You're the One: The Best of the Vogues - the Vogues
 VSD-5682 John Travolta Sings - John Travolta
 VSD-5683 When I Dream - Helen Reddy
 VSD-5684 Even Stevens - Ray Stevens
 VSD-5685 Gitarzan - Ray Stevens
 VSD-5686 History of Dot Records: Volume One: Young Love - various artists
 VSD-5687 History of Dot Records: Volume Two: Come Go with Me - various artists
 VSD-5688 John & Jen (1996 OCR) - Andrew Lippa & Tom Greenwald
 VSD-5689 Othello - Charlie Mole
 VSD-5690 The Best of the Beatles Songbook - the Hollyridge Strings
 VSD-5691 The Jean-Claude Van Damme Action Collection - various artists (Colosseum Records European release, not issued in the US)
 VSD-5692 Sherlock Holmes: Classic Themes from 221 B Baker Street - Lanny Meyers conducts
 VSD-5693 Hi-Fi Music for Influentials - Steve Allen
 VSD-5694 Nice Work if You Can Get It: The Best of the Hi-Lo's - the Hi-Lo's
 VSD-5695 The Sun Sessions - Charlie Rich
 VSD-5696 The Private Lives of Elizabeth and Essex - Erich Wolfgang Korngold / Carl Davis conducts
 VSD-5697 Sugar Shack: The Best of Jimmy Gilmer and the Fireballs - Jimmy Gilmer and the Fireballs
 VSD-5698 Lawnmower Man 2: Beyond Cyberspace - Robert Folk
 VSD-5699 City Hall - Jerry Goldsmith
 VSDE-5700 Star Wars: Shadows of the Empire - Joel McNeely / John Williams ("Star Wars Theme") (Features enhanced CD-ROM content about the recording of the music)
 VSD-5701 It's My Party - Basil Poledouris / Olivia Newton-John (songs) (Solo piano score performed by Poledouris and recorded for one dollar)
 VSD-5702 Dark Shadows: 30th Anniversary Collection - Bob Cobert
 VSD-5703 On the Air! The Classic Comedy of Steve Allen - Steve Allen
 VSD-5704 History of Challenge Records - various artists
 VSD-5705 Dick Bartley Presents Collector's Essentials: Volume One: The '60s - various artists
 VSD-5706 Dick Bartley Presents Collector's Essentials: Volume Two: The 70s - various artists
 VSD-5707 A Funny Thing Happened on the Way to the Forum... in Jazz - Stephen Sondheim / the Trotter Trio
 VSD-5708 99.5 FM the Hawk: All Rock & Roll Hits - various artists
 VSD-5709 Cinema Soundtrack Hits - various artists (Colosseum Records European release, not issued in the US)
 VSD-5710 Cinema Soundtrack Classics - various artists (Colosseum Records European release, not issued in the US)
 VSD-5711 You're Never Fully Dressed Without a Smile: Jason Graae Sings Charles Strouse - Jason Graae
 VSD-5712 The Thorn Birds II: The Missing Years - Henry Mancini / Garry McDonald / Lawrence Stone
 VSD-5713 Franz Waxman: Legends of Hollywood: Volume 4 - Franz Waxman, Richard Mills conducts
 VSD-5714 Executive Decision - Jerry Goldsmith
 VSD-5715 London Pride: Songs of the London Stage - Twiggy
 VSD-5716 The Quest - Randy Edelman
 VSD-5717 Magic Moments: The Classic Songs of Gerry and the Pacemakers - Gerry and the Pacemakers
 VSD-5718 Soulful Pop - various artists
 VSD-5719 Bubblegum Classics: Volume Three - various artists
 VSD-5720 Mrs. Winterbourne - Patrick Doyle
 VSD-5721 Drat! The Cat! (1997 OCR) - Ira Levin & Milton Schafer
 VSD-5722 The Musical Adventures of Peter Pan - various artists
 VSD-5723 Cool & Classic: Great Film Themes of the '60s - Fred Karlin conducts
 VSD-5724 The Best of Bo Donaldson and the Heywoods - Bo Donaldson and the Heywoods
 VSD-5725 Love Grows (Where My Rosemary Goes): The Voice of Tony Burrows - Tony Burrows
 VSD-5726 Wax, Board & Woodie: Surf & Hot Rod - various artists
 VSD-5727 Golden Summer Days: The Legendary Masked Surfers - Jan & Dean
 VSD-5728 Tales from the Crypt Presents: Bordello of Blood - Chris Boardman (score album)
 VSD-5729 Bed & Sofa (1996 OCR) - Polly Pen & Laurence Klavan
 VSD-5730 I Do! I Do! (1996 OCR) - Tom Jones & Harvey Schmidt
 VSD-5731 The Beast - Don Davis
 VSD-5732 The Craft - Graeme Revell (score album)
 VSD-5733 That's the Way Love Goes: The Final Recordings of Lefty Frizzell - Lefty Frizzell
 VSD-5734 Momma, Gimme a Drink of Water - Didi Conn / Milton Schafer
 VSD-5735 The Michel Legrand Album - the Trotter Trio
 VSD-5736 The Songs of Steven Allen - various artists
 VSD-5737 One More Tomorrow: The Best of Henry Gross - Henry Gross featuring "Shannon"
 VSD-5738 The Seattle Years 1978-1984 - Iain Matthews
 VSD-5739 Midnight Mission - Carla Olson & the Textones
 VSD-5740 Cowgirls (1996 OCR) - Mary Murfitt
 VSD-5741 The Alan Menken Album - Debbie Shapiro Gravitte
 VSD-5742 The MGM Album - Debbie Shapiro Gravitte
 VSD-5743 Under Paris Skies - Andy Williams
 VSD-5744 Maybe ... Maybe Not - Torsten Breuer / Max Raabe
 VSD-5745 Alaska - Reg Powell (Planned, assigned a catalog number and cancelled)
 VSD-5746 Chain Reaction - Jerry Goldsmith
 VSD-5747 1966-1979: The Best of Hank Thompson - Hank Thompson
 VSD-5748 The Harper Valley P.T.A.: The Best of Jeannie C. Riley - Jeannie C. Riley
 VSD-5749 The Chad Mitchell Trio Collection - the Chad Mitchell Trio
 VSD-5750 Xena: Warrior Princess - Joseph LoDuca
 VSD-5751 American Buffalo / Threesome - Thomas Newman
 VSD-5752 Romeo & Juliet: Shakespearian Classics from Stage and Screen - Cliff Eidelman conducts, Royal Scottish National Orchestra (Features an original composition The Tempest composed and conducted by Eidelman exclusive to this album)
 VSD-5753 The Alien Trilogy - Jerry Goldsmith / James Horner / Elliot Goldenthal - Cliff Eidelman conducts
 VSD-5754 To Kill a Mockingbird - Elmer Bernstein conducts, (re-recording with Royal Scottish National Orchestra)
 VSD-5755 Last Man Standing - Elmer Bernstein (Rejected score for 1996 film starring Bruce Willis featuring artwork by Matthew Joseph Peak)
 VSD-5756 Maximum Risk - Robert Folk
 VSD-5757 Bulletproof - Elmer Bernstein
 VSD-5758 The Chamber - Carter Burwell
 VSD-5759 Vertigo (Original film tracks) - Bernard Herrmann / Muir Mathieson conducts
 VSD-5760 Cool & Classic: Great Film Themes of the '70s - Fred Karlin conducts
 VSD-5761 Stephen King's Thinner - Daniel Licht
 VSD-5762 Star Trek: 30th Birthday Edition - Fred Steiner conducts
 VSD-5763 The King and I (1996 OCR starring Lou Diamond Phillips) - Richard Rodgers & Oscar Hammerstein II
 VSD-5764 Hollywood '96 - various artists / Joel McNeely conducts the Royal Scottish National Orchestra
 VSD-5765 Psycho - Bernard Herrmann / Joel McNeely conducts (re-recording)
 VSD-5766 The Batman Trilogy - Danny Elfman / Elliot Goldenthal / Neal Hefti / Joel McNeely conducts (Original first pressing of CD featured original painted artwork by Matthew Joseph Peak which was retained for the European releases. The later US pressings featured a different cover that was a little more generic)
 VSD-5767 Extreme Measures - Danny Elfman
 VSD-5768 Lost in Boston IV (Additional songs rejected from major musicals) - various artists
 VSD-5769 Unsung Musicals III - various artists
 VSD-5770 Highlights From Unsung Irving Berlin - various artists
 VSD-5771 I Love You, You're Perfect, Now Change (1996 original cast) - Joe DiPietro & Jimmy Roberts
 VSD-5772 Hey, Love: The Songs of Mary Rodgers (1997 original cast starring Faith Prince) - various artists
 VSD-5773 The Best of Halloween 1-6 - John Carpenter / Alan Howarth
 VSD-5774 The Very Best of the Platters - the Platters
 VSD-5775 Down to Earth - Jimmy Buffett
 VSD-5776 High Cumberland Jubilee - Jimmy Buffett
 VSD-5777 The Very Best of Chuck Jackson - Chuck Jackson
 VSD-5778 Johns - Danny Caron / Charles Brown
 VSD-5779 Set It Off - Christopher Young (score album)
 VSD-5780 Mother Night - Michael Convertino
 VSD-5781 The First Wives Club - Marc Shaiman (score album)
 VSD-5782 The '50s Remembered: The Pop Vocalists Era - Dick Haymes / Alan Dale / Johnny Desmond / Don Cherry
 VSD-5783 The '50s Remembered: The Pop Vocalists Era - Toni Arden / Kitty Kallen / Jane Morgan / Sylvia Syms
 VSD-5784 La Paloma - Billy Vaughn
 VSD-5785 Vintage Rock - Bill Deal and the Rhondels
 VSD-5786 Then You Can Tell Me Goodbye: The Best of the Casinos - the Casinos
 VSD-5787 Let's All Chant: The Michael Zager Dance Collection - Michael Zager
 VSD-5788 Moog: The Electric Eclectics of Dick Hyman - Dick Hyman
 VSD-5789 The Ernie Kovacs Record Collection - Ernie Kovacs
 VSD-5790 Cugie A-Go-Go - Xavier Cugat
 VSD-5791 Blast Off - Ferrante & Teicher
 VSD-5792 Fierce Creatures - Jerry Goldsmith
 VSD-5793 Dante's Peak - John Frizzell / James Newton Howard (Featuring original themes by James Newton Howard for the film included on the album)
 VSD-5794 Sketches on Star Wars - John Williams / the Trotter Trio
 VSD-5795 The Sand Pebbles - Jerry Goldsmith (re-recording), Goldsmith conducts the Royal Scottish National Orchestra
 VSD-5796 Patton / Tora! Tora! Tora! - Jerry Goldsmith (re-recording) Goldsmith conducts
 VSD-5797 The Charming Miss Edie Adams - Edie Adams
 VSD-5798 Chicago... and All That Jazz - the Brad Ellis Group
 VSD-5800 Who's Afraid of Virginia Woolf? - Alex North / Jerry Goldsmith conducts
 VSD-5801 Sunshine Days Pop '60s Classics: Volume One - various artists
 VSD-5802 Sunshine Days Pop '60s Classics: Volume Two - various artists
 VSD-5803 Sunshine Days Pop '60s Classics: Volume Three - various artists
 VSD-5804 You Gotta Have Heart: The Songs of Richard Adler - Marlene VerPlanck
 VSD-5805 Sondheim at the Movies - various artists
 VSD-5806 Citizen Kane - Bernard Herrmann / Joel McNeely conducts, the Royal Scottish National Orchestra
 VSD-5807 The Towering Inferno: Great Disaster Classics - various artists / Joel McNeely & John Debney conducts the Royal Scottish National Orchestra
 VSD-5808 Absolute Power - Lennie Niehaus / Clint Eastwood
 VSD-5810 On My Own: Michelle Nicastro on Broadway - Michelle Nicastro
 VSD-5811 Unique Original RKO Masters - the Vagabonds
 VSD-5812 Unique Original RKO Masters - the Harmonicats
 VSD-5813 The Very Best of B. J. Thomas - B. J. Thomas
 VSD-5815 No Way to Treat a Lady (1997 OCR) - Douglas J. Cohen
 VSD-5816 Out of Africa - John Barry / Joel McNeely conducts
 VSD-5817 Torn Curtain (rejected score) - Bernard Herrmann / Joel McNeely conducts (Debut of complete rejected score from 1966 Alfred Hitchcock film performed by the Royal Scottish National Orchestra)
 VSD-5818 "Surrender" (remix single) - Helen Reddy
 VSD-5819 A Little Night Music - Stephen Sondheim / Terry Trotter performs
 VSD2-5820 Sondheim: A Celebration - various artists
 VSD-5821 Batmania: Songs Inspired by Batman - various artists
 VSD-5822 The Jane Morgan Collection - Jane Morgan
 VSD-5823 The Caterina Valente Collection - Caterina Valente
 VSD-5824 Golden Age of Lounge - Ian Whitcomb
 VSD-5825 Air Force One - Jerry Goldsmith (Original 1997 release does not contain material composed by Joel McNeely for the film)
 VSD2-5826 Cole Porter: A Musical Toast - various artists
 VSD-5827 As Time Goes By - Rudy Vallee
 VSD-5828 Friendly Persuasion - Dimitri Tiomkin
 VSD-5829 Buddy - Elmer Bernstein
 VSD-5830 Free Willy 3: The Rescue - Cliff Eidelman
 VSD-5831 Because of You: Fifties Gold - Jeff Harnar
 VSD-5832 1941 - John Williams (Reissue of Bay Cities CD from 1988)
 VSD-5833 Volcano - Alan Silvestri
 VSD-5834 Donnie Brasco - Patrick Doyle (score album)
 VSD-5835 8 Heads in a Duffel Bag - Andrew Gross
 VSD-5836 Bliss - Jan A. P. Kaczmarek
 VSD-5837 Play On! (1997 OCR) - Duke Ellington
 VSD-5838 Leave It to Beaver - Randy Edelman
 VSD-5839 Pledging My Love - Lou Christie
 VSD-5840 The Legendary Singing Cowboy: Chapter One - Gene Autry
 VSD-5841 Gene Autry With the Legendary Singing Groups of the West - Gene Autry
 VSD-5842 Greatest Hits: Volume Two - Roy Clark
 VSD-5843 Whispering Bill: Greatest Hits: Volume Two - Bill Anderson
 VSD-5844 The Country Hits Collection - Ray Stevens
 VSD-5845 The Country Hits Collection - Johnny Tillotson
 VSD-5846 On the Radio: Dick Bartley Presents Collector's Essentials: Volume One - various artists
 VSD-5847 On the Radio: Dick Bartley Presents Collector's Essentials: Volume Two - various artists
 VSD-5848 Planet of the Apes / Escape from the Planet of the Apes - Jerry Goldsmith
 VSD-5849 Journey to the Center of the Earth - Bernard Herrmann
 VSD-5850 The Ghost and Mrs. Muir - Bernard Herrmann
 VSD-5851 The Mephisto Waltz / The Other - Jerry Goldsmith
 VHV-5852 Jerry Herman's Broadway at the Hollywood Bowl - various artists
 VSD-5853 Wedding Bell Blues - various artists
 VSD-5854 The Best of Cabaret - various artists
 VSD-5855 The Best of the Broadway Divas - various artists
 VSD-5856 The Best of Off-Broadway - various artists
 VSD-5857 Forever Amber - David Raksin / Alfred Newman conducts
 VSD-5858 Prime Time Musicals - various artists
 VSD-5859 Tales from a Parallel Universe - Marty Simon
 VSD-5860 This World, Then the Fireworks - Pete Rugolo
 VSD-5861 Terminator 2: Judgment Day - The Special Edition - Brad Fiedel (This was a special European release that features no additional material housed in a silver slipcase)
 VSD-5862 Kull the Conqueror - Joel Goldsmith
 VSD-5863 Mimic - Marco Beltrami
 VSD-5865 Science Fiction & Fantasy: TV Sound Trek - various artists
 VSD-5866 Singin' and Swingin - the Modernaires
 VSD-5867 The Gay 90s Musical (1997 OCR) - various artists
 VSD-5868 Lilies - Mychael Danna
 VSD-5869 Washington Square - Jan A. P. Kaczmarek
 VSD-5870 A Thousand Acres - Richard Hartley
 VSD-5871 Frontiers - Jerry Goldsmith (This was an album re-recording that featured music from all science fiction films composed by Goldsmith and performed by the Royal Scottish National Orchestra)
 VSD-5872 Live at the Village Gate - Flip Wilson
 VSD-5873 The Burt Bacharach Songbook - Burt Bacharach
 VSD-5874 The Very Best of Johnny Bond - Johnny Bond
 VSD-5875 Cinderella: Songs from the Classic Fairy Tale - various artists
 VSD-5876 The Night of the Hunter (1998 OCR) - Claibe Richardson & Stephen Cole
 VSD-5877 Starship Troopers - Basil Poledouris
 VSD-5878 Erock for Kids: Songs You Can't Get Out of Your Head - Erock
 VSD-5879 Erock for Kids: Songs You Can't Get Out of Your Head (blister pack) - Erock
 VSD-5880 Ragtime: Themes from the Hit Musical - Brad Ellis
 VSD-5881 Classic TV Game Show Themes - various artists
 VSD-5882 It Came from Outer Space: Alien Songbook - various artists
 VSD-5883 Xena: Warrior Princess: Volume 2 - Joseph LoDuca
 VSD-5884 Hercules: The Legendary Journeys: Volume 2 - Joseph LoDuca
 VSD-5885 L.A. Confidential - Jerry Goldsmith (score album)
 VSD-5886 The Man Who Knew Too Little - Christopher Young
 VSD-5887 Mad City - Thomas Newman
 VSD-5888 The Paul Simon Album - various artists
 VSD-5889 The Burt Bacharach Album - various artists
 VSD-5890 Bubblegum Classics: Volume 4: Soulful Pop - various artists
 VSD-5891 For Richer or Poorer - Randy Edelman
 VSD-5892 Mouse Hunt - Alan Silvestri
 VSD-5893 Shiloh - Joel Goldsmith
 VSD-5894 Songs from the Silver Screen - Judy Kaye
 VSD-5895 The Winter Guest - Michael Kamen (Solo piano score performed by Kamen)
 VSD-5896 Bubblegum Classics: Volume 5: The Voice of Tony Burrows - various artists
 VSD-5897 You Turn Me On: The Best of Ian Whitcomb - Ian Whitcomb
 VSD-5898 Live at Caesars Palace - Tom Jones
 VSD-5899 Live at the Riviera, Las Vegas - Engelbert Humperdinck
 VSD-5900 Viva Zapata! - Alex North / Jerry Goldsmith conducts (re-recording) the Royal Scottish National Orchestra
 VSD-5901 The Agony and the Ecstasy - Alex North / Jerry Goldsmith conducts (re-recording), the Royal Scottish National Orchestra
 VSD-5902 Sedaka's Back - Neil Sedaka
 VSD-5903 The Inspirational Collection - Pat Boone
 VSD-5904 The Inspirational Collection - B. J. Thomas
 VSD-5905 Louie Louie: The Very Best of the Kingsmen - the Kingsmen
 VSD-5906 God, Love and Rock & Roll - various artists
 VSD-5907 The Della Reese Collection - Della Reese
 VSD-5908 The Roger Williams Collection - Roger Williams
 VSD-5909 The Singing Cowboy: Chapter Two - Gene Autry
 VSD-5910 Gene Autry and His Little Darlin' Mary Lee - Gene Autry & Mary Lee
 VSD-5911 Somewhere in Time - John Barry / John Debney conducts (Re-recording of the complete score to popular 1980 film with the Royal Scottish National Orchestra)
 VSD-5912 There's No Business Like Show Business - Irving Berlin / Alfred Newman
 VSD-5913 Sphere - Elliot Goldenthal
 VSD-5914 U.S. Marshals - Jerry Goldsmith
 VSD-5915 The Replacement Killers - Harry Gregson-Williams
 VSD-5916 The Irish… and How They Got That Way (1998 original cast) - various artists
 VSD2-5917 Lerner, Loewe, Lane & Friends: 14th Annual S.T.A.G.E. Benefit - various artists
 VSD-5918 Xena: Warrior Princess: Volume 3: The Bitter Suite - Joseph LoDuca
 VSD-5919 The Ferrante & Teicher Collection - Ferrante & Teicher
 VSD-5920 Godzilla: 50 Years of Themes - Randy Miller conducts
 VSD-5921 Moby Dick - Christopher Gordon
 VSD-5922 Kissing a Fool - Joseph Vitarelli / various artists
 VSD-5923 Broadway's Biggest '97-'98 - various artists
 VSD-5924 Wild Things - George S. Clinton
 VSD-5925 Mercury Rising - John Barry
 VSD-5926 Titanic: The Ultimate Collection - various artists / Randy Miller conducts (re-recording)
 VSD-5927 Drop Down and Get Me - Del Shannon
 VSD-5928 The Very Best of Jimmy Wakely - Jimmy Wakely
 VSD-5929 Merlin - Trevor Jones
 VSD-5930 The Best of Al Hibbler - Al Hibbler
 VSD-5931 The Les Brown Songbook - Les Brown
 VSD-5932 Sunshine Days: Pop '60s Classics: Volume 4 - various artists
 VSD-5933 Sunshine Days: Pop '60s Classics: Volume 5 - various artists
 VSD-5934 Follies: Themes from the Legendary Musical - the Trotter Trio
 VSD-5935 In Like Flint / Our Man Flint - Jerry Goldsmith
 VSD-5936 Paulie - John Debney / various artists
 VSD-5937 Music from the Golden Age: Classic 20th Century Fox Films - various artists (Compilation of themes from 20th Century Fox scores that the label would eventually release as both regular releases, re-recordings and as part of the Varèse Club)
 VSD-5938 The Very Best of Gary U.S. Bonds - Gary U.S. Bonds
 VSD-5939 Color, Rhythm & Magic: Classic Disney Instrumentals - Earl Rose
 VSD-5940 Midway - John Williams / Richard Wentworth conducts (re-recording)
 VSD-5941 Amazing Stories - John Williams / Georges Delerue / John Debney conducts (re-recording)
 VSD-5942 Othello (1998 ballet score) - Elliot Goldenthal
 VSD-5943 Titanic: The Classic Film Scores of James Horner - James Horner / John Debney conductor (This album is a mixture of previously released or re-recorded material previously released from the label of music by James Horner with the exception of a newly re-recorded Titanic suite only available on this album conducted by John Debney)
 VSD-5944 Alone Together - Linda Purl
 VSD-5945 Cabaret: Themes from the Hit Musical - John Kander & Fred Ebb / the Brad Ellis Little Big Band
 VSD-5946 A Perfect Murder - James Newton Howard
 VSD-5947 Beyond the Blue Horizon - Lou Christie
 VHV-5947 Rock 'N' Roll Legends Live - various artists
 VSD-5948 The Hungry Years - Neil Sedaka
 VSD-5949 Battlestar Galactica - Stu Phillips (re-recording), the Royal Scottish National Orchestra
 VSD-5950 Back to the Future Trilogy - Alan Silvestri / John Debney conducts (This album is a mixture of previously released (Back to the Future Part III or newly re-recorded material from Back to the Future & Back to the Future Part II and the debut of Back to the Future: The Ride only available on this album conducted by John Debney)
 VSD-5951 Body Heat - John Barry / Joel McNeely conducts (re-recording), London Symphony Orchestra
 VSD-5952 Steppin' Out - Neil Sedaka
 VSD-5953 The Clique - the Clique
 VSD-5954 Kites are Fun: The Best of the Free Design - the Free Design
 VSD-5955 Barry Scott Presents Lost 45s of the '70s & '80s - various artists
 VSD-5956 A Broadway Love Story - Christiane Noll
 VSD-5957 Hit TV: Television's Top Themes - various artists
 VSD-5958 Duets - Emily Skinner & Alice Ripley
 VSD-5959 Scream / Scream 2 - Marco Beltrami (score album)
 VSD-5961 The 7th Voyage of Sinbad - Bernard Herrmann / John Debney conducts (re-recording)
 VSD-5962 Center Stage - Helen Reddy
 VSD-5963 Small Soldiers - Jerry Goldsmith (score album)
 VSD-5964 Return to Paradise - Mark Mancina
 VSD-5965 Titanic Tunes: A Sing-A-Long in steerage - Ian Whitcomb & the Musical Murrays
 VSD-5966 Songs From the Titanic Era - Ian Whitcomb & the New White Star Orchestra
 VSD-5967 Satin Sheets: The Greatest Hits of Jeanne Pruett - Jeanne Pruett
 VSD-5968 The Very Best of Tommy Overstreet - Tommy Overstreet
 VSD-5969 Monster Mania: The Classic Music from Godzilla Movies - Randy Miller conducts (re-recording)
 VSD-5970 Halloween: 20th Anniversary Edition - John Carpenter (Features dialog excerpts but very minimal new additional material)
 VSD-5971 The Trouble with Harry - Bernard Herrmann / Joel McNeely conducts (re-recording)
 VSD-5972 One True Thing - Cliff Eidelman
 VSD-5973 On the Radio: Dick Bartley Presents Collector's Essentials: Volume Three - various artists
 VSD-5974 On the Radio: Dick Bartley Presents Collector's Essentials: Volume Four - various artists
 VSD-5975 Videodrome - Howard Shore
 VSD-5976 Blade - Mark Isham (score album)
 VSD-5977 Ronin - Elia Cmíral
 VSD-5978 Here for You - Petula Clark
 VSD-5979 It Don't Mean a Thing if It Ain't Got That Swing - the Buddy Bregman Band
 VSD-5980 Rounders - Christopher Young
 VSD2-5981 Superman: The Movie - John Williams / John Debney conducts (re-recording of classic original soundtrack that was completely reconstructed)
 VSD2-5982 The English Patient and Other Arthouse Classics - Gabriel Yared / David Hirschfelder / Wojciech Kilar / John Debney conducts, Lydia Cochrane (solo piano) (re-recording of suites from Shine, The Portrait of a Lady, The English Patient and The Piano to solo performances by Cochrane with the Royal Scottish National Orchestra)
 VSD-5983 Young Hercules - Joseph LoDuca
 VSD-5984 Softly, as I Leave You - Roger Williams
 VSD-5985 Soldier - Joel McNeely
 VSD-5986 A Portrait of Terror - John Ottman / John Carpenter ("Theme From Halloween") (Rejected score for the 1998 film Halloween H20: 20 Years Later)
 VSD-5987 More Songs from the Burt Bacharach Songbook - various artists
 VSD-5988 Pleasantville - Randy Newman (score album)
 VSD-5989 The Siege - Graeme Revell
 VSD-5990 20 Greatest Movie Hits - Gene Autry
 VSD-5991 Love Songs - Gene Autry
 VSD-5992 Dick Bartley Presents Rock & Roll's Greatest Love Songs - various artists
 VSD-5993 Here for You (Special Sunset Boulevard Tour Edition) - Petula Clark
 VSD-5994 Lasso from El Paso - Kinky Friedman
 VSD-5995 Live at the Hotel Seville - the Lovin' Spoonful
 VSD-5996 The Magic Circle - the Mamas & the Papas
 VSD-5997 The Very Best of Johnny Tillotson - Johnny Tillotson
 VSD-5998 Superman: The Ultimate Collection - various artists / Randy Miller conducts (re-recording) (Compilation of themes for the DC Comics superhero from the radio shows to the films)
 VSD-5999 As Thousands Cheer (1999 original cast recording) - Irving Berlin
 VSD-6001 In Dreams - Elliot Goldenthal
 VSD-6002 25 All Time Greatest Hits - Gene Pitney
 VSD-6003 Payback - Chris Boardman / various artists
 VSD-6004 Swingin' the Standards - Bobby Darin
 VSD-6005 Regeneration - Mychael Danna
 VSD-6006 The Very Best of the Wooden Nickel Years (1971–1973) - the Siegel–Schwall Band
 VSD-6007 If I Were a Carpenter: 1966-1969: The Very Best of Bobby Darin - Bobby Darin
 VSD-6008 Discoveries Presents Stereo Oldies - various artists
 VSD-6009 Discoveries Presents Classic Instrumental Oldies - various artists
 VSD-6010 The Grass Harp (1999 OCR) - Claibe Richardson & Kenward Elmslie
 VSD-6011 Little Me (1999 OCR) - Cy Coleman & Carolyn Leigh
 VSD-6012 The Sondheim Collection - various artists
 VSD-6013 Jawbreaker - Stephen Endelman (score album)
 VSD-6014 The Corruptor - Carter Burwell (score album)
 VSD-6015 You've Got Mail - George Fenton (score album)
 VSD-6016 Analyze This - Howard Shore / various artists (announced, assigned catalog number and canceled)
 VSD-6017 The West Coast East Side Sound: Volume One - various artists
 VSD-6018 The West Coast East Side Sound: Volume Two - various artists
 VSD-6019 The West Coast East Side Sound: Volume Three - various artists
 VSD-6020 The West Coast East Side Sound: Volume Four - various artists
 VSD-6021 Alice in Wonderland - Richard Hartley
 VSD-6022 Good Stuff! - Jerry McCain
 VSD-6023 I Believe in Music - Wayne Newton
 VSD-6024 Little by Little (1999 OCR) - Brad Ross, Ellen Greenfield & Hal Hackady
 VSD2-6025 The Song of Bernadette - Alfred Newman
 VSD-6026 The Matrix - Don Davis (score album)
 VSD-6027 Noah's Ark - Paul Grabowsky
 VSD-6028 16 Greatest Hits - Susan Raye
 VSD-6029 25 All Time Greatest Hits - the Shirelles
 VSD-6030 Trojan Songs: The Very Best of Tom Fogerty - Tom Fogerty
 VSD-6031 Xena: Warrior Princess: Volume 4 - Joseph LoDuca
 VSD-6032 Hercules: The Legendary Journeys: Volume 3 - Joseph LoDuca
 VSD-6033 Cinema Romance - Omoté-Sando
 VSD-6034 Here Comes Santa Claus - Gene Autry
 VSD-6035 Happy Together: The Very Best of White Whale Records - various artists
 VSD-6036 All Strung Out - Nino Tempo & April Stevens
 VSD-6037 The Best of the Blues Band - the Blues Band
 VSD-6038 The 13th Warrior - Jerry Goldsmith
 VSD-6039 I Paralyze - Cher
 VSD-6040 Bowfinger - David Newman / various artists
 VSD-6041 Instinct - Danny Elfman
 VSD-6042 Wild Wild West - Elmer Bernstein / Peter Bernstein (score album)
 VSD-6043 The Minus Man - Marco Beltrami / various artists
 VSD-6044 The Kander & Ebb Album - Brent Barrett
 VSD-6045 The Stephen Schwartz Album - various artists
 VSD-6046 Out at the Movies - various artists
 VSD-6047 Great Composers - John Williams
 VSD-6048 Sun Records Presents 25 All Time Greatest Hits - various artists
 VSD-6049 Piano Quintet / String Quartet #2 - Erich Wolfgang Korngold
 VSD-6050 Lo Mucho Que Te Quiero - René y René
 VSD-6051 The Ellington Legacy - Duke Ellington
 VSD-6052 Tender Is the Night / A Hatful of Rain / The Man in the Gray Flannel Suit - Bernard Herrmann
 VSD-6053 Garden of Evil / Prince of Players / King of the Khyber Rifles - Bernard Herrmann
 VSD-6054 The Haunting - Jerry Goldsmith
 VSD-6055 Lake Placid - John Ottman
 VSD-6056 The Complete Original Sun Singles - Johnny Cash
 VSD-6057 The First Time Live, a Long Time Ago at Washington University in St. Louis, Missouri 1962 - the Dillards
 VSD-6058 Matters of the Heart - Patti LuPone
 VSD-6059 You Go-Go Girl - Nancy Sinatra
 VSD-6060 Muppets from Space - Jamshied Sharifi (score album)
 VSD-6061 The Sixth Sense - James Newton Howard
 VSD-6062 The Iron Giant - Michael Kamen (score album)
 VSD-6063 Deep Blue Sea - Trevor Rabin (score album)
 VSD-6064 Teaching Mrs. Tingle - John Frizzell (score album)
 VSD-6065 Frank Guida Presents If You Wanna Be Happy: The Best of the Norfolk Sound - various artists
 VSD-6066 Dark Shadows - Bob Cobert
 VSD-6067 Live in Concert - Freda Payne
 VSD-6068 Universal Soldier: The Return - Don Davis (score album)
 VSD-6069 Journey to the Center of the Earth - Bruce Rowland
 VSD-6070 Peyton Place - Franz Waxman / Frederic Talgorn conducts
 VSD-6071 A Christmas Carol - Stephen Warbeck
 VSD-6072 In Too Deep - Christopher Young (score album)
 VSD-6073 Bacharach: The Instrumental Side - various artists
 VSD-6074 Unsuspecting Hearts - Emily Skinner & Alice Ripley
 VSD-6075 After the Fair (1999 OCR) - Matthew Ward & Stephen Cole
 VSD-6076 The Story Hour - Sally Mayes
 VSD-6077 Great Composers - Elmer Bernstein
 VSD-6078 Jaws - John Williams / Joel McNeely conducts (re-recording) the Royal Scottish National Orchestra
 VSD-6079 16 Greatest Hits - the Kendalls
 VSD-6080 Kimberly - Basil Poledouris
 VSD-6082 Animal Farm - Richard Hartley
 VSD-6083 If Love Were All (1999 OCR) - Twiggy & Harry Groener / Noël Coward
 VSD-6084 Born Free - John Barry / Frederic Talgorn conducts (re-recording)
 VSD-6085 Surfin - the Beach Boys
 VSD-6086 The Phantom Menace and Other Movie Hits - various artists / Frederic Talgorn conducts (re-recording)
 VSD2-6087 The Twilight Zone - Bernard Herrmann / Joel McNeely conducts (re-recording)
 VSD-6088 House on Haunted Hill - Don Davis
 VSD-6089 Rose of Washington Square - Al Jolson & Alice Faye
 VSD-6090 State Fair (1945 & 1962) - Richard Rodgers & Oscar Hammerstein II / Alfred Newman conducts
 VSD-6091 Anna and the King of Siam - Bernard Herrmann
 VSD-6092 For Love of the Game - Basil Poledouris (score album)
 VSD-6093 The Adventures of Superman: Music from the 1950s TV Series - various artists
 VSD-6094 Marnie - Bernard Herrmann / Joel McNeely conducts (re-recording) the Royal Scottish National Orchestra
 VSD-6095 Saturday Night Fever: Themes from the Hit Musical - Grant Geissman
 VSD-6096 Devoted to You: Love Songs - the Everly Brothers
 VSD-6097 25 All-Time Greatest Recordings - the Chordettes
 VSD-6098 The Very Best of Chad & Jeremy - Chad & Jeremy
 VSD-6099 End of Days - John Debney (score album)
 VSD-6101 25 All-Time Greatest Hits - Joe Tex
 VSD-6102 The Best of the '50s Masters (1957–1959) - Billy Ward and his Dominoes
 VSD-6103 Shake It Up, Baby - the Isley Brothers
 VSD-6104 Greatest Hits: Volume One - B. J. Thomas
 VSD-6105 Tighter, Tighter - Tommy James
 VSD-6106 My Dog Skip - William Ross
 VSD-6107 Diamonds - Joel Goldsmith
 VSD-6108 This Is El Chicano - El Chicano
 VSD-6109 Reheated - Canned Heat
 VSD-6110 Dick Bartley Presents: The Greatest All-Girl Groups - various artists
 VSD-6111 Palisades Park: The Best of the Swan Recordings - Freddy Cannon
 VSD-6112 Barry Scott Presents: Lost 45s of the '70s & '80s: Volume 2 - various artists
 VSD-6113 25 All-Time Greatest Hits - the Champs
 VSD-6114 The Whole Nine Yards - Randy Edelman / various artists
 VSD-6115 The 10th Kingdom - Anne Dudley
 VSD-6116 Scream 3 - Marco Beltrami (score album)
 VSD-6117 Warmth of the Sun: Music Inspired by the Beach Boys - various artists
 VSD-6118 The Very Best of Claudine Longet - Claudine Longet
 VSD-6119 Lonely Street - Andy Williams
 VSD-6120 Hanging Up - David Hirschfelder / various artists
 VSD-6121 Miss Abrams and the Strawberry Point 4th Grade Class - Rita Abrams
 VSD-6122 Swinging With the Duke - Duke Ellington
 VSD-6123 Blues and Ballads - Duke Ellington
 VSD-6124 Movie Memories: A Golden Age Revisited - various artists / Richard Kaufman conducts (re-recording)
 VSD-6125 Hamlet - Carter Burwell (score album)
 VSD-6126 Wonder Boys - Christopher Young (assigned a number, planned for release and cancelled. A promo was produced and released)
 VSD-6128 Up at the Villa - Pino Donaggio
 VSD-6129 25 All-Time Greatest Sun Records Hits - Jerry Lee Lewis
 VSD-6130 The Complete Sun Singles - Carl Perkins
 VSD-6131 The Very Best of Bobby Sherman - Bobby Sherman
 VSD-6132 25 All-Time Greatest Bubblegum Hits - various artists
 VSD-6133 Paleophonic - the Rubinoos
 VSD-6134 The Very Best of Jimmy Wakely - Jimmy Wakely
 VSD-6135 The Very Best of Tex Ritter - Tex Ritter
 VSD-6136 The Very Best of Eddie Dean - Eddie Dean
 VSD-6137 The Very Best of Tex Williams - Tex Williams
 VSD-6138 The Very Best of Noel Boggs - Noel Boggs
 VSD-6139 Christmas Collection - Jimmy Wakely
 VSD-6140 The Big Kahuna - Christopher Young / various artists
 VSD-6141 Arabian Nights - Richard Harvey
 VSD-6142 Don Quixote - Richard Hartley
 VSD-6143 I Dreamed of Africa - Maurice Jarre
 VSD-6144 Battlefield Earth - Elia Cmiral
 VSD-6145 Xena: Warrior Princess: Volume 5: Lyre, Lyre, Hearts on Fire - Joseph LoDuca
 VSD-6146 Screen Magic: Songs from Animated Film Classics - various artists
 VSD-6147 Rockin - the Crickets
 VSD-6148 25-All Time Greatest Summer Songs - various artists
 VSD-6149 Sons of the Beaches - Flash Cadillac & the Continental Kids
 VSD-6150 Last Kiss: Songs of Teen Tragedy - various artists
 VSD-6151 28 Days - Richard Gibbs / various artists
 VSD-6152 Running Free - Nicola Piovani
 VSD-6153 On the Beach - Christopher Gordon
 VSD-6154 Shanghai Noon - Randy Edelman
 VSD-6155 First Blood - Jerry Goldsmith (Reissue of Intrada Records release from 1988)
 VSD-6156 The Night Stalker & Other Classic Themes - Bob Cobert
 VSD-6157 Child of Our Times: The Trousdale Demo Sessions 1965–1967 - P. F. Sloan
 VSD-6158 The Sound of Music - Ferrante & Teicher
 VSD-6159 The Best of TV Quiz & Game Show Themes - various artists
 VSD-6160 Rebecca - Franz Waxman / Joel McNeely conducts the Royal Scottish National Orchestra
 VSD-6161 The Last of the Mohicans - Trevor Jones / Randy Edelman / Joel McNeely conducts (re-recording) the Royal Scottish National Orchestra
 VSD-6162 The 3 Worlds of Gulliver - Bernard Herrmann / Joel McNeely conducts (re-recording) the Royal Scottish National Orchestra
 VSD-6163 The Ultimate Star Trek - various artists / Jerry Goldsmith, Cliff Eidelman & Frederic Talgorn conduct (re-recording) the Royal Scottish National Orchestra
 VSD-6164 20 Number One Hits - Merle Haggard
 VSD-6165 25 All-Time Greatest 4-Star Recordings - Patsy Cline
 VSD-6166 The Gene Autry Show: Volume 1 - Gene Autry
 VSD-6167 The Gene Autry Show: Volume 2 - Gene Autry
 VSD-6168 The Gene Autry Show: Volume 3 - Gene Autry
 VSD-6169 You Know Me - Jackie DeShannon
 VSD-6170 Dragonheart: A New Beginning - Mark McKenzie / Randy Edelman (Theme)
 VSD-6171 Hollow Man - Jerry Goldsmith
 VSD-6172 What Lies Beneath - Alan Silvestri
 VSD-6173 Lover's Prayer - Joel McNeely
 VSD-6174 The Doo-Wop Sound: Street Corner Harmony: Volume 1 - various artists
 VSD-6175 The Doo-Wop Sound: Street Corner Harmony: Volume 2 - various artists
 VSD-6176 Bali - Wondermints
 VSD-6177 Steal This Movie! - Mader (score album)
 VSD-6178 Live at the Kalidescope 1969 - Canned Heat
 VSD-6179 Urban Legends: Final Cut - John Ottman (also directed and co-edited the film)
 VSD-6180 The Replacements - John Debney / various artists
 VSD-6181 The Watcher - Marco Beltrami (Hidden bonus track included during the final track)
 VSD-6182 Gone in 60 Seconds - Trevor Rabin (score album)
 VSD-6183 Hercules: The Legendary Journeys: Volume 4 - Joseph LoDuca
 VSD-6184 Nurse Betty - Rolfe Kent / various artists
 VSD-6185 On the Radio: Collectors Essentials: Volume 5 - Dick Bartley presents
 VSD-6186 On the Radio: Collectors Essentials: Volume 6 - Dick Bartley presents
 VSD-6187 All the Love - Fran Jeffries
 VSD-6188 Latin Broadway - various artists
 VSD-6189 Rita Moreno - Rita Moreno
 VSD-6190 The Gene Autry Show - Gene Autry
 VSD-6191 Lost Souls - Jan A.P. Kaczmarek
 VSD-6192 Ban This! Live from Cavestomp - the Standells
 VSD-6193 Let's Start a Beat – Live from Cavestomp - the Monks
 VSD-6194 Bounce - Mychael Danna (score album)
 VSD-6195 Pay It Forward - Thomas Newman
 VSD-6196 The 6th Day - Trevor Rabin
 VSD-6197 Total Recall: The Deluxe Edition - Jerry Goldsmith (Hidden bonus track included on album: "The Rekall Theme Song")
 VSD-6198 Love Decides - Jane Olivor
 VSD-6199 The Home Recordings - Johnny Bond
 VSD-6200 Cruel Intentions (rejected score) and Selected Suites & Themes - John Ottman (Features the complete rejected score to 1999 film and suites from Incognito, The Cable Guy, Snow White: A Tale of Terror and others)
 VSD-6201 MechWarrior 4: Vengeance - Duane Decker
 VSD-6202 An Everlasting Piece - Hans Zimmer (Score was recorded for only one dollar)
 VSD-6203 Legend: The Deluxe Edition - Jerry Goldsmith (assigned a number, planned for release and cancelled. Reissued by Silva Screen Records)
 VSD-6204 20 Greatest Songs - Roy Acuff
 VSD-6205 20 Greatest Songs - Don Gibson
 VSD-6206 There Goes the Neighborhood - the Dillard/Haynes Band
 VSD-6207 Vertical Limit - James Newton Howard
 VSD-6208 Proof of Life - Danny Elfman
 VSD-6209 Have a Heart: The Love Songs Collection - B.J. Thomas
 VSD-6210 25-All Time Greatest Hits - Johnny Tillotson
 VSD-6211 All-Time Greatest Hits - Ray Stevens
 VSD-6212 Philadelphia USA - various artists
 VSD-6213 Cast Away: The Films of Robert Zemeckis - Alan Silvestri (Compilation featuring a suite from the 2000 film and other films)
 VSD-6214 Roads Less Travelled - Johnny Cash & the Tennessee Two
 VSD-6215 Echoes of the Stanley Brothers - Ralph Stanley & the Clinch Mountain Boys
 VSD-6216 This Love is for Real - Brenton Wood
 VSD-6217 The Complete Cadence Recordings (1957–1960) - the Everly Brothers
 VSD-6218 Beatles Classics - Enoch Light
 VSD-6219 Then: Totally Oldies: Volume One - various artists
 VSD-6220 One Night - Susan Anton
 VSD-6221 Best Foot Forward (1963 original cast recording) - Hugh Martin & Ralph Blane
 VSD-6222 Live at Symphony Hall, Boston, Massachusetts - Tom Rush
 VSD2-6223 Great Composers - Georges Delerue
 VSD2-6224 Cleopatra - Alex North
 VSD2-6225 In Sessions: A Film Music Celebration - various artists (re-recording)
 VSD-6226 The Dish - Edmund Choi / various artists
 VSD-6227 Monkeybone - Anne Dudley
 VSD-6228 You Were on My Mind: The Very Best of Sylvia Tyson - Sylvia Tyson
 VSD-6229 Spirit in the Sky - Norman Greenbaum
 VSD-6230 Waiting for a Song - Denny Doherty
 VSD-6231 1958-1962: The Very Best of Wynn Stewart - Wynn Stewart
 VSD-6232 The Sun Sessions - Ike Turner & the Kings of Rhythm
 VSD-6233 The Complete Sun Sessions - Roy Orbison
 VSD-6234 Then: Totally Oldies: Volume Two - various artists
 VSD-6235 Best of the Boston Sound - various artists
 VSD-6236 The Very Best of Orpheus - Orpheus
 VSD-6237 The Very Best of Ultimate Spinach - Ultimate Spinach
 VSD-6238 Along Came a Spider - Jerry Goldsmith
 VSD-6239 Just Visiting - John Powell
 VSD-6240 Boy Singer - Peter Marshall
 VSD-6241 Aliens: The Deluxe Edition - James Horner
 VSD-6242 The Very Best of Johnny and the Hurricanes - Johnny and the Hurricanes
 VSD-6243 The Tailor of Panama - Shaun Davey
 VSD-6244 O - Jeff Danna (score album)
 VSD-6245 Pavilion of Women - Conrad Pope
 VSD-6246 The Girl Group Sound: 25 All-Time Greatest from Red Bird Records - various artists
 VSD-6247 Downhearted Blues: Live at the Cookery - Alberta Hunter
 VSD-6248 20 All-Time Greatest Hits - Johnny Maestro & the Crests
 VSD-6249 The Best of Bobby Day - Bobby Day
 VSD-6250 Never My Love: The Lost Album Sessions - the Addrisi Brothers
 VSD-6251 Wow & Flutter - Kyle Vincent
 VSD-6252 20 Classics - Conway Twitty
 VSD-6253 To You Sweetheart, Aloha - Andy Williams
 VSD-6254 Sun Records: 25 Blues Classics - various artists
 VSD2-6255 Xena: Warrior Princess: Volume 6 - Joseph LoDuca
 VSD-6256 Evolution - John Powell
 VSD-6257 Sordid Lives - George S. Clinton / Olivia Newton-John
 VSD-6258 Meisner, Swan & Rich Jr. - Meisner, Swan & Rich Jr.
 VSD-6259 Greatest Hits Live - Vancouver 1986 - Donovan
 VSD-6260 Live Anthology 1965-1968 - the Spencer Davis Group
 VSD-6261 Denizens of the Deep - Ferrante & Teicher
 VSD-6262 A Lot of Things Different - Bill Anderson
 VSD-6263 96 Tears: The Very Best of ? and the Mysterians - ? and the Mysterians
 VSD-6264 Out of This World - Live at the Bitter End - Kenny Vance and the Planotones
 VSD-6265 Remember Pearl Harbor: Songs That Won Pearl Harbor - various artists
 VSD-6266 The Mists of Avalon - Lee Holdridge
 VSD-6267 The Score - Howard Shore
 VSD-6268 Sister Mary Explains It All / Lovesick / The Manhattan Project - Philippe Sarde
 VSD-6269 The Rockets - the Rockets
 VSD-6270 25 All-Time Greatest Hits - Del Shannon
 VSD-6271 The Western Collection: 25 Cowboy Classics - Gene Autry
 VSD-6272 Goin' Back to Texas: 25 Texas Classics - Gene Autry
 VSD-6273 Greatest Hits - Dorothy Moore
 VSD-6274 All-Time Greatest Hits - Kris Kristofferson
 VSD-6275 The Ventures Play the Greatest Surf Hits of All Time - the Ventures
 VSD-6276 American Outlaws - Trevor Rabin
 VSD-6277 Jay and Silent Bob Strike Back - James L. Venable (score album)
 VSD-6278 Cats & Dogs - John Debney
 VSD-6279 Rush Hour 2 - Lalo Schifrin (score album)
 VSD-6280 Baby Boy - David Arnold (score album)
 VSD-6281 When Good Ghouls Go Bad - Christopher Gordon
 VSD-6282 The Glass House - Christopher Young
 VSD-6283 Bubble Boy - John Ottman
 VSD-6284 Incurably Romantic - Toni Tennille
 VSD-6285 Songs of the Season - Jane Olivor
 VSD-6286 John Carpenter's Ghosts of Mars - John Carpenter
 VSD-6287 The Mole - David Michael Frank
 VSD-6288 The Omen: The Deluxe Edition - Jerry Goldsmith
 VSD-6289 The Final Conflict: The Deluxe Edition - Jerry Goldsmith
 VSD-6290 Joy Ride - Marco Beltrami
 VSD-6291 Don't Say a Word - Mark Isham
 VSD-6292 Collateral Damage - Graeme Revell
 VSD-6293 I'll Be Home for Christmas - various artists
 VSD-6294 Christmas Jump & Jive - various artists
 VSD-6295 Alleluia - Benedictine Monks of St. Michael's
 VSD-6296 From Hell - Trevor Jones / Marilyn Manson
 VSD-6297 Life as a House - Mark Isham
 VSD-6298 Thirteen Ghosts - John Frizzell
 VSD-6299 Heart & Soul - Dusty Springfield
 VSD-6300 Love Songs - Patsy Cline
 VSD-6301 Heart & Soul Guitar - Tony Mottola
 VSD-6302 You Belong to My Heart - Engelbert Humperdinck
 VSD-6303 25 All-Time Greatest Hits: 1956-1961 the Cadence Years - Andy Williams
 VSD-6304 25 All-Time Greatest Hits - Frankie Avalon
 VSD-6305 Sign of the Times - Petula Clark
 VSD-6306 The Diamond Collection - Marilyn Monroe
 VSD-6307 Black Knight - Randy Edelman
 VSD-6308 Shrek - Harry Gregson-Williams / John Powell (score album)
 VSD-6309 Damien: Omen II: The Deluxe Edition - Jerry Goldsmith
 VSD-6310 The One - Trevor Rabin
 VSD-6311 Come to My Garden - Minnie Riperton
 VSD-6312 America Forever - Ferrante & Teicher
 VSD-6313 Domestic Disturbance - Mark Mancina
 VSD-6314 The Day the Earth Stood Still - Bernard Herrmann / Joel McNeely conducts (re-recording)
 VSD-6315 The Billy Vaughn Collection - Billy Vaughn
 VSD-6316 Sunset Boulevard - Franz Waxman / Joel McNeely conducts (re-recording)
 VSD-6317 I Am Sam - John Powell (score album)
 VSD-6318 The Affair of the Necklace - David Newman
 VSD-6319 In the Bedroom - Thomas Newman
 VSD-6320 Jimmy Neutron: Boy Genius - John Debney (assigned a number, planned for release and cancelled)
 VSD-6321 Mountain Breakdown: The Bluegrass Collection - various artists
 VSD-6322 The Best of the McCormick Brothers - the McCormick Brothers
 VSD-6323 The Very Best of Wilma Lee & Stoney Cooper  - Wilma Lee Cooper & Stoney Cooper
 VSD-6324 Then: Totally Oldies: Volume Three - various artists
 VSD-6326 The Very Best of Arthur Lyman - Arthur Lyman
 VSD-6327 Her Very Best - Gogi Grant
 VSD-6328 Live in Las Vegas - Paul Anka
 VSD-6329 25 All-Time Greatest Novelty Hits - various artists
 VSD-6330 Last Orders - Paul Grabowsky
 VSD-6331 Harrison's Flowers - Cliff Eidelman
 VSD-6332 Essential Sun Singles - Johnny Cash & the Tennessee Two
 VSD-6333 25 Hits from the British Invasion - various artists
 VSD-6334 American Roots of the British Invasion - various artists
 VSD-6335 Original Hit Recordings: The Very Best of the Bachelors - the Bachelors
 VSD-6336 Green Dragon - Mychael & Jeff Danna
 VSD-6337 The Time Machine - Klaus Badelt
 VSD-6338 Dragonfly - John Debney
 VSD-6339 25 All-Time Greatest Doo-Wop Hits - various artists
 VSD-6340 At This Moment - Billy Vera & the Beaters
 VSD-6341 Where the Action Is (1964–1981): The Very Best of Freddy Cannon - Freddy Cannon
 VSD-6342 Roger Miller Classics - Roger Miller
 VSD-6343 The Very Best of Jeannie C. Riley - Jeannie C. Riley
 VSD-6344 Live in San Francisco 1966 - Big Brother and the Holding Company
 VSD-6345 Don't Forget to Boogie: Vintage Heat - Canned Heat
 VSD-6346 Panic Room - Howard Shore
 VSD-6347 Greatest Hits - Doug & Rusty Kershaw
 VSD-6348 Gail Davies - Gail Davies
 VSD-6349 Legendary Masked Surfer: The Dean Torrence Anthology - Dean Torrence
 VSD-6350 Andy & David - the Williams Brothers
 VSD-6351 The Salton Sea - Thomas Newman
 VSD-6352 Dinotopia - Trevor Jones (assigned a number, planned for release and cancelled. Released on CMP Recordings)
 VSD-6353 Changing Lanes - David Arnold
 VSD-6354 Rollerball - André Previn / various artists
 VSD-6355 Jason X - Harry Manfredini
 VSD-6356 Unfaithful - Jan A. P. Kaczmarek
 VSD-6357 Insomnia - David Julyan
 VSD-6358 Ice Age - David Newman
 VSD-6359 Anthology 1953-1961 - Little Milton
 VSD-6361 All-Time Greatest Hits - the Duprees
 VSD-6362 The Very Best of the Olympics - the Olympics
 VSD-6363 A Tribute to the King - Ronnie McDowell
 VSD-6364 Totally Classic Country - various artists
 VSD-6365 Blade II - Marco Beltrami (score album)
 VSD-6366 Enough - David Arnold
 VSD-6367 The Bourne Identity - John Powell
 VSD-6368 The Scorpion King - John Debney (score album)
 VSD-6369 Johnny Cash with His Hot and Blue Guitar! - Johnny Cash
 VSD-6370 The Very Best of Merle Travis - Merle Travis
 VSD-6371 The Singing Cowboy - Jimmy Wakely
 VSD-6372 Country Pioneer - Rusty Richards
 VSD-6373 The Singing Cowboys Collection - various artists
 VSD-6374 Reign of Fire - Edward Shearmur
 VSD-6375 The Complete Red Bird Recordings - the Dixie Cups
 VSD-6376 Tracey Takes On the Hits - Tracey Ullman
 VSD-6377 Collection - the Irish Rovers
 VSD-6378 25 All-Time Greatest Hits - Maxine Brown
 VSD-6379 Halloween: Resurrection - Danny Lux
 VSD-6380 Eight Legged Freaks - John Ottman
 VSD-6381 Sun Records: 25 Red-Hot Rockabilly Classics - various artists
 VSD-6382 The Sun Songbook - various artists
 VSD-6383 Sun Records: 25 More Blues Classics - various artists
 VSD-6384 The Rockin' Blues: 25 Great Sun Recordings - Jerry Lee Lewis
 VSD-6385 I'm Gonna Shake It: The Sun Recordings - Rosco Gordon
 VSD3-6386 Sun Records: 50th Anniversary Box - various artists
 VSD-6387 Simone - Carter Burwell
 VSD-6388 Fear Dot Com - Nicholas Pike
 VSD-6389 All Time Greatest Hits Live - Tommy James and the Shondells
 VSD-6390 Play the Instrumental Hits - the Ventures
 VSD-6391 12 Classics - Bill Anderson
 VSD-6392 12 Classlcs - Duke Ellington
 VSD-6393 12 Hits - the Everly Brothers
 VSD-6394 12 Hits - the Kendalls
 VSD-6395 12 Hits - Ray Stevens
 VSD-6396 12 Hits - Joe Tex
 VSD-6397 12 Hits of the '60s: Volume One - various artists
 VSD-6398 12 Hits of the '60s: Volume Two - various artists
 VSD-6399 Great Science Fiction Blockbusters - various artists
 VSD-6400 Great Movie Love Themes - various artists
 VSD-6401 Christmas Joy - the Ventures
 VSD-6402 City by the Sea - John Murphy / various artists
 VSD-6403 An Irish Christmas - the Irish Rovers
 VSD-6404 Winter Wonderland - various artists
 VSD-6405 Santa's Greatest Hits - various artists
 VSD-6406 Holiday Magic - Beautiful Music for Christmas - various artists
 VSD-6407 Then: Totally Oldies: Volume Four - various artists
 VSD-6408 The Cowboy is a Patriot - Gene Autry
 VSD-6409 Casino Royale - Burt Bacharach (Reissue of VSD-5265)
 VSD-6410 No Place Like Home on Christmas - Bill Anderson
 VSD-6411 Trapped - John Ottman
 VSD-6412 Star Trek: Nemesis - Jerry Goldsmith
 VSD-6413 Ballistic: Ecks vs. Sever - Don Davis / various artists
 VSD-6414 The Tuxedo - John Debney / Christophe Beck
 VSD-6415 Swept Away - Michel Colombier
 VSD-6416 Below - Graeme Revell
 VSD-6417 White Oleander - Thomas Newman
 VSD-6418 The Man from Elysian Fields - Anthony Marinelli
 VSD-6419 Ghost Ship - John Frizzell
 VSD-6420 Ballistic: Ecks vs. Sever - Don Davis (score album)
 VSD-6421 Far from Heaven - Elmer Bernstein
 VSD-6422 The Boys of Belfast: A Collection of Irish Favorites - the Irish Rovers
 VSD-6423 XXX - Randy Edelman (score album)
 VSD-6424 The Emperor's Club - James Newton Howard
 VSD-6425 First Offering - the Peasall Sisters
 VSD-6426 The Quiet American - Craig Armstrong
 VSD-6427 In the Wind: The Folk Music Collection - various artists
 VSD-6429 RoboCop - Basil Poledouris (semi-expansion of VCD-47300)
 VSD-6430 Star Trek: Nemesis (SACD) - Jerry Goldsmith
 VSD-6432 Rock & Roll's Classic Love Songs - various artists
 VSD-6433 The Recruit - Klaus Badelt
 VSD-6434 Two Weeks Notice - John Powell
 VSD-6435 Nicholas Nickleby - Rachel Portman
 VSD-6436 The Zombies - the Zombies
 VSD-6437 The Very Best of the Easybeats - the Easybeats
 VSD-6438 First Sessions - Warren Zevon
 VSD2-6439 Essential Sons of the Pioneers - Sons of the Pioneers
 VSD-6440 Frank Yankovic & his Yanks - Frankie Yankovic
 VSD-6441 Sings the Songs That Made Him Famous - Johnny Cash
 VSD-6442 The Greatest - Johnny Cash
 VSD-6443 The Ventures Play the Greatest Instrumental Hits of All-Time: Volume 2 - the Ventures
 VSD-6444 Then: Totally Oldies 1980s - various artists
 VSD-6445 Play the Country Classics - the Bluegrass All-Stars
 VSD-6446 The Essential Cadence Singles - Everly Brothers
 VSD-6447 The Lost '60s Recordings - Rick Nelson / Jerry Fuller / Glen Campbell / Dave Burgess
 VSD-6448 Daredevil - Graeme Revell (score album)
 VSD-6449 Darkness Falls - Brian Tyler
 VSD-6450 The Hunted - Brian Tyler
 VSD-6451 12 Classics - Ed Bruce
 VSD-6452 12 Country Classics: Volume 1 - various artists
 VSD-6453 12 Country Classics: Volume 2 - various artists
 VSD-6454 Children of Dune - Brian Tyler
 VSD-6455 Love is a Long Hard Road - the Kendalls
 VSD-6456 Dreamcatcher - James Newton Howard
 VSD-6457 Tears of the Sun - Hans Zimmer featuring Lebo M.
 VSD-6458 25 More All-Time Doo-Wop Hits - various artists
 VSD-6459 Identity - Alan Silvestri
 VSD4-6460 Varèse Sarabande 25th Anniversary Collection - various artists
 VSD-6461 The Hank Williams Songbook - Hank Williams
 VSD-6462 Hal Lifson's 1966 - various artists
 VSD-6463 Classics - Bill Anderson
 VSD-6464 Johnny Cash Sings Hank Williams and Other Favorites - Johnny Cash
 VSD-6465 20 Disco Classics: The 30th Anniversary Collection - various artists
 VSD-6466 Invitation Only - Mickey Gilley
 VSD-6467 25 Beach Music Classics - various artists
 VSD-6468 Now Here's Johnny Cash - Johnny Cash
 VSD-6469 Something Wild - Aaron Copland
 VSD-6470 Get Down Tonight: Greatest Hits Live - KC and the Sunshine Band
 VSD-6471 Hemispheres - Dan Siegel
 VSD-6472 Garden of Earthly Delights: The Best of Mark Winkler - Mark Winkler
 VSD-6473 Sun Records 25 Rare Blues Classics - various artists
 VSD-6474 Wrong Turn - Elia Cmiral (score album)
 VSD-6475 Bruce Almighty - John Debney / various artists
 VSD-6476 Classic Country: Volume 2: 16 Original Hits - various artists
 VSD-6477 Girls! Girls! Girls! 25 All-Time Classics - various artists
 VSD3-6478 Sun Records Ultimate Blues Collection - various artists
 VSD-6479 The Fabulous Jimmy Dorsey - the Jimmy Dorsey Orchestra
 VSD-6480 Essential Western Swing - Spade Cooley
 VSD-6481 Terminator 3: Rise of the Machines - Marco Beltrami
 VSD-6482 The Italian Job - John Powell
 VSD-6483 The Very Best of Sue Thompson - Sue Thompson
 VSD-6484 25 Rockin' Instrumentals - various artists
 VSD-6485 The Best of the Gap Band 1984-1988 - the Gap Band
 VSD-6486 Guilty - Yarbrough and Peoples
 VSD-6487 All Aboard the Blue Train - Johnny Cash
 VSD-6488 The Original Sun Sound of Johnny Cash - Johnny Cash
 VSD-6489 Classics: Volume One - Ernest Tubb
 VSD-6490 Louisiana Man: Best of Live - Doug Kershaw
 VSD-6491 Along the Blues Highway - Chris Thomas King & Blind Mississippi Morris
 VSD-6492 The League of Extraordinary Gentlemen - Trevor Jones (Issued in the US via Varèse Sarabande website exclusively. Colosseum Records wide release in Europe)
 VSD-6493 Then: Totally Oldies: Volume Six: The Seventies - various artists
 VSD-6494 The Very Best of Charley Pride (1987–1989) - Charley Pride
 VSD-6495 The Very Best of the Newbeats - the Newbeats
 VSD-6496 Jeepers Creepers 2 - Bennett Salvay
 VSD-6497 Passionada - Harry Gregson-Williams
 VSD-6498 Freddy vs. Jason - Graeme Revell / Charles Bernstein (Nightmare On Elm Street theme) (score album)
 VSD-6499 Gigli - John Powell
 VSD-6500 The Great Train Robbery: The Deluxe Edition - Jerry Goldsmith
 VSD-6501 S.W.A.T. - Elliot Goldenthal
 VSD-6502 Lara Croft: Tomb Raider – The Cradle of Life - Alan Silvestri (score album)
 VSD-6503 Life is Large - The Kennedys
 VSD-6504 River of Fallen Stars - the Kennedys
 VSD-6505 Complete UK Recordings 1972-1974 - 10cc
 VSD-6506 Complete Singles Plus: 1958-1963 the Sun Years - Charlie Rich
 VSD-6507 More Than You Know - Toni Tennille
 VSD-6508 Lost Cabin Sessions - the Ozark Mountain Daredevils
 VSD-6509 Five-A-Side: The Best of Ace - Ace featuring Paul Carrack
 VSD-6510 Along the Blues Highway - Rockin' Tabby Thomas / Annette Taborn
 VSD-6512 All-Time Greatest Hits - Bobby Vinton
 VSD-6513 The Event - Christophe Beck / various artists
 VSD-6514 Out of Time - Graeme Revell
 VSD-6515 Matchstick Men - Hans Zimmer
 VSD-6516 The Rundown - Harry Gregson-Williams (Welcome to the Jungle is the European title for the film. The Colosseum release features different artwork)
 VSD-6517 Live at McCabe's - Townes Van Zandt
 VSD-6518 Poltergeist II: The Other Side: The Deluxe Edition - Jerry Goldsmith
 VSD-6519 Lost Treasures: Sentimental Journey - Doris Day / Les Brown
 VSD-6520 Gothika - John Ottman
 VSD-6521 Alias: Season 1 - Michael Giacchino
 VSD-6522 Taken - Laura Karpman
 VSD-6523 Looney Tunes: Back in Action - Jerry Goldsmith
 VSD-6524 Runaway Jury - Christopher Young
 VSD-6525 Elf - John Debney (score album)
 VSD-6526 Sylvia - Gabriel Yared
 VSD-6527 21 Grams - Gustavo Santaolalla / various artists
 VSD-6528 Dreamkeeper - Stephen Warbeck
 VSD-6529 Beyond Borders - James Horner
 VSD-6530 The Gospel of John - Jeff Danna
 VSD-6531 Timeline - Brian Tyler
 VSD-6532 House of Sand and Fog - James Horner
 VSD-6533 Scary Movie 3 - James L. Venable / various artists
 VSD-6534 Peter Pan - James Newton Howard
 VSD-6535 Paycheck - John Powell
 VSD-6536 Surfin' to Baja - the Ventures
 VSD-6537 Cash Sings Cash - Johnny Cash
 VSD-6538 Romantic Standards: The Great American Love Songs Collection - various artists
 VSD-6539 The Statement - Normand Corbeil
 VSD-6540 Heartache - Wanda Jackson
 VSD2-6541 British Invasion Box - various artists
 VSD-6542 Chitty Chitty Bang Bang - Richard M. Sherman & Robert B. Sherman
 VSD-6543 Twisted - Mark Isham
 VSD-6544 Traffic: The Miniseries - Jeff Rona
 VSD2-6545 The Blues is Alright - Little Milton with Mighty Sam McClain & Reverend Raven
 VSD-6546 Then: Totally Oldies: Volume 7: The '80s Again - various artists
 VSD-6547 The B. T. Puppy Years 1964-1967: The Very Best of the Tokens - the Tokens
 VSD-6548 The Best of Zydeco Party Band - Zydeco Party Band
 VSD-6549 The Best of Bill Haley & His Comets (1951–1954) - Bill Haley & His Comets
 VSD-6550 Dance Album - Carl Perkins
 VSD-6551 The Essential King Masters - Billy Ward and his Dominoes
 VSD-6552 The Big Bounce - George S. Clinton
 VSD-6553 Essential Masters - Jackie Wilson / Billy Ward and his Dominoes
 VSD-6554 Rock & Roll: The First 50 Years: The '50s - various artists
 VSD-6555 25 Classic Do-Wap Ballads - various artists
 VSD-6556 1963–1965, The Very Best of Fats Domino - Fats Domino
 VSD-6557 Rock & Roll: The First 50 Years: The Early '60s - various artists
 VSD-6558 The Inspirational Collection - the Oak Ridge Boys
 VSD-6559 The Magnificent Seven - Elmer Bernstein (reissue)
 VSD-6560 The Thomas Crown Affair - Michel Legrand (reissue)
 VSD-6561 The Complete Plantation Recordings - the Flatlanders
 VSD-6562 Hellboy - Marco Beltrami
 VSD-6563 Godsend - Brian Tyler
 VSD2-6564 The Thorn Birds - Henry Mancini
 VSD-6565 Garage Rock Classics - various artists
 VSD-6566 Big Sur - Bobby Darin
 VSD-6567 Best Gospel - various artists
 VSD-6568 I Love You - the Zombies
 VSD-6569 Essential First Recordings - Patsy Cline
 VSD-6570 Last Tango in Paris - Gato Barbieri (Reissue of Rykodisc release)
 VSD-6571 The Lion in Winter - Richard Hartley
 VSD-6572 The Day After Tomorrow - Harald Kloser
 VSD-6573 Rancho Deluxe - Jimmy Buffett (Reissue of Rykodisc release)
 VSD-6574 Greatest Hits: Live at the Bottom Line - Lou Christie
 VSD-6575 Wynn Stewart & Joan Howard - Wynn Stewart & Joan Howard
 VSD-6576 Command Performance - Patti Page
 VSD-6577 Bobby Jones: Stroke of Genius - James Horner
 VSD-6578 Battle of Britain - Ron Goodwin / Sir William Walton
 VSD-6579 The Very Best of Peggy Scott & Jo Jo Benson - Peggy Scott & Jo Jo Benson
 VSD-6580 The Chronicles of Riddick - Graeme Revell
 VSD-6581 Starship Troopers 2: Hero of the Federation - John Morgan & William Stromberg
 VSD-6582 The Great Escape - Elmer Bernstein (Reissue of Rykodisc release)
 VSD-6583 Man on Fire - Harry Gregson-Williams
 VSD-6584 The Intimate Mel Tormé: Isn't It Romantic - Mel Tormé
 VSD-6585 The Clearing - Craig Armstrong
 VSD-6586 Salem's Lot - Christopher Gordon / Lisa Gerrard
 VSD-6587 The Missouri Breaks - John Williams (Reissue of Rykodisc release)
 VSD-6588 Monk - Jeff Beal
 VSD-6589 Drift Away and Other Classics - Dobie Gray
 VSD-6590 Good Rockin' Tonight: 25 Essential Rock & Rhythm Classics - various artists
 VSD-6591 I, Robot - Marco Beltrami
 VSD-6592 Original Motion Picture Soundtrack - John Powell
 VSD-6593 Complete Columbia Christmas Recordings - Gene Autry
 VSD-6594 Have Yourself a Merry Little Christmas - Rosemary Clooney
 VSD-6595 Some Like It Hot - Adolph Deutsch (Reissue of Rykodisc release)
 VSD-6596 The Misfits - Alex North (Reissue of Rykodisc release)
 VSD-6597 I'm a Boogie Man: The Essential Masters (1948–1953) - John Lee Hooker
 VSD-6598 Dealing With the Devil: 25 Essential Blues Masters - various artists
 VSD-6599 Shining Through the Rain - Percy Sledge
 VSD-6600 Timeline: The Unused Score (SACD) - Jerry Goldsmith (Release of rejected score from 2003 film)
 VSD-6601 Tom Sawyer / Huckleberry Finn - Richard M. Sherman & Robert B. Sherman
 VSD-6602 Jerry Lee Lewis - Jerry Lee Lewis
 VSD-6603 The Manchurian Candidate - Rachel Portman with Wyclef Jean / David Amram (Also included is part of the score from the 1962 film by Amram)
 VSD3-6604 The Greatest Story Ever Told - Alfred Newman (Reissue of Ryko three-disc release)
 VSD-6605 Alien vs. Predator - Harald Kloser
 VSD-6606 Paparazzi - Brian Tyler
 VSD-6607 Anacondas: The Hunt for the Blood Orchid - Nerida Tyson-Chew
 VSD-6608 Rear View Mirror: Volume 2 - Townes Van Zandt
 VSD-6609 The Essential Masters - the Stanley Brothers
 VSD-6610 A Private Concert - Townes Van Zandt
 VSD-6611 Space Guitar: The Essential Early Masters - Johnny Watson
 VSD-6612 Sex and the '60s - various artists
 VSD-6613 Sun Records: 25 Rock & Roll Classics - various artists
 VSD-6614 Rock & Roll: The First 50 Years: The Mid '60s - various artists
 VSD-6615 The Final Cut - Brian Tyler
 VSD-6616 Resident Evil: Apocalypse - Jeff Danna (score album)
 VSD-6617 The Cutting Edge: The Deluxe Edition - Patrick Williams / various artists (Reissue of Rykodisc release which includes the premiere release of original score that was not included on original CD release)
 VSD-6618 Carrie - Pino Donaggio (Reissue of Rykodisc release)
 VSD-6619 The Forgotten - James Horner
 VSD-6620 Surviving Christmas - Randy Edelman / various artists
 VSD-6621 Being Julia - Mychael Danna / various artists
 VSD-6622 Alias: Season 2 - Michael Giacchino
 VSD-6623 The Grudge - Christopher Young
 VSD-6624 A Tribute to Brian Wilson - Brian Wilson
 VSD-6625 Earthsea - Jeff Rona
 VSD-6626 24: The Soundtrack - Sean Callery
 VSD-6627 Carnivàle - Jeff Beal
 VSD-6628 Flight of the Phoenix - Marco Beltrami
 VSD-6629 Shrek 2 - Harry Gregson-Williams (score album)
 VSD-6630 Meet the Fockers - Randy Newman
 VSD-6631 Racing Stripes - Mark Isham
 VSD-6632 Spanglish - Hans Zimmer
 VSD-6633 Elektra - Christophe Beck (score album)
 VSD-6634 Assault on Precinct 13 - Graeme Revell
 VSD-6635 Days of Our Lives: Love Songs - various artists
 VSD-6636 Constantine - Brian Tyler / Klaus Badelt
 VSD-6637 Rock & Roll: The First 50 Years: The Late '60s - various artists
 VHV-6638 In Dublin: A Little Bit of Irish - Bing Crosby
 VSD-6639 Million Dollar Baby - Clint Eastwood
 VSD-6640 Robots - John Powell (score album)
 VSD-6641 Too Good to Be True - Everly Brothers
 VSD-6642 Complete '60s Duets - George Jones & Gene Pitney with the Jordanaires
 VSD-6643 Dust to Glory - Nathan Furst
 VSD-6644 Sin City - Robert Rodriguez, John Debney & Graeme Revell
 VSD-6645 Kung Fu Hustle - Raymond Wong / various artists
 VSD-6646 Country Comes to Carnegie Hall - Roy Clark, Freddy Fender, Hank Thompson & Don Williams
 VSD-6647 Promises, Promises (1968 OCR) - Burt Bacharach & Hal David (Reissue of Rykodisc release)
 VSD-6648 Man of La Mancha - Mitch Leigh & Joe Darion / Laurence Rosenthal conducts (Reissue of Rykodisc release)
 VSD-6649 Scattered, Smothered & Covered - Webb Wilder
 VSD-6650 Champagne Favorites - Lawrence Welk
 VSD-6651 The Interpreter - James Newton Howard
 VSD-6652 House of Wax - John Ottman (score album)
 VSD-6653 Under Western Skies - Sons of the Pioneers
 VSD-6654 Hour of the Gun - Jerry Goldsmith (Reissue of Intrada Records release)
 VSD7-6655 Original Albums: Complete Collection - Johnny Cash
 VSD-6656 Then: Totally Oldies: Volume 8: Classic Rock - various artists
 VSD-6657 Greatest Hits - Red Sovine
 VSD-6658 The Adventures of Sharkboy and Lavagirl in 3-D - Robert Rodriguez, John Debney & Graeme Revell
 VSD-6659 Guys and Dolls: Solo Piano - Earl Rose
 VSD-6660 The Way I Feel - Bill Anderson
 VSD-6661 All My Love Belongs to You - Steve Lawrence
 VSD-6662 All Night Long (Live!) - Muddy Waters
 VSD-6663 Stripes - Elmer Bernstein
 VSD-6664 Alive Five-O: Greatest Hits Live - the Ventures
 VSD-6665 The Sisterhood of the Traveling Pants - Cliff Eidelman (score album)
 VSD-6666 Land of the Dead - Reinhold Heil & Johnny Klimek
 VSD-6667 Fantastic Four - John Ottman (score album)
 VSD-6668 Power Pops - various artists
 VSD-6669 Essential Gospel Masters - the Stanley Brothers
 VSD-6670 The Skeleton Key - Edward Shearmur / various artists
 VSD-6671 Live at the Ice House 1978 - Modern Folk Quartet
 VSD-6672 Crazy Rhythm - Les Paul & His Trio
 VSD-6673 The Great Raid - Trevor Rabin
 VSD-6674 East L.A.: Rockin' the Bario - various artists
 VSD-6675 Land of a Thousand Dances - Cannibal & the Headhunters
 VSD-6676 Stealth - BT / Trevor Morris (score album)
 VSD-6677 Back to Back Bacharach - Casino Royale
 VSD-6678 Proof - Stephen Warbeck
 VSD-6679 Four Brothers - David Arnold (score album)
 VSD-6680 It's About Time, It's About Me - Roy Clark
 VSD-6681 Give Me a Future - Everly Brothers
 VSD-6682 Serenity - David Newman
 VSD-6683 An Unfinished Life - Deborah Lurie
 VSD-6684 Greatest Hits - the Wilburn Brothers
 VSD-6685 Country Legend  - Johnny Horton
 VSD-6686 Wallace & Gromit: The Curse of the Were-Rabbit - Julian Nott / Rupert Gregson-Williams, etc.
 VSD3-6687 The Omen Trilogy - Jerry Goldsmith (Repackaging of all the deluxe editions of the soundtracks in a slipcase box set)
 VSD2-6688 The Fly I & II - Howard Shore / Christopher Young (reissue)
 VSD-6689 A Nightmare On Elm Street - Charles Bernstein (reissue)
 VSD-6690 Nanny McPhee - Patrick Doyle
 VSD-6691 All-Time Greatest Hits Live On Stage - Ferrante & Teicher
 VSD-6692 Lovers Island - Kenny Vance and the Planotones
 VSD-6693 Stay - Thad Spencer & Mark Asche
 VSD-6694 Prime - Ryan Shore / various artists
 VSD-6695 Water - Mychael Danna
 VSD-6696 Where the Truth Lies - Mychael Danna
 VSD-6697 The Fog - Graeme Revell
 VSD-6698 A Private Concert - Townes Van Zandt
 VSD-6699 Firefly - Greg Edmonson
 VSD-6700 Stargate: Atlantis - Joel Goldsmith
 VSD-6701 Duma - John Debney / George Acogny
 VSD-6702 Doom - Clint Mansell
 VSD-6703 Music to Watch Girls By: The Best of the Bob Crewe Generation - the Bob Crewe Generation
 VSD-6704 The High and the Mighty: A Century of Flight - Richard Kaufman conducts
 VSD-6705 Zathura - John Debney
 VSD-6706 Doom - Clint Mansell
 VSD-6707 Æon Flux - Graeme Revell
 VSD-6708 Take Another Piece of My Heart - Bettye LaVette
 VSD-6709 Annapolis - Brian Tyler
 VSD-6710 Hostel - Nathan Barr
 VSD-6711 Fun with Dick and Jane - Theodore Shapiro
 VSD-6712 The Family Stone - Michael Giacchino
 VSD-6713 Tristan & Isolde - Anne Dudley
 VSD-6714 The Ten Commandments - Randy Edelman
 VSD-6715 Firewall - Alexandre Desplat
 VSD-6716 Early Recordings 1959 - the Dillards
 VSD-6717 Freedomland - James Newton Howard
 VHV-6718 40 Years of Classic Country - Bill Anderson
 VSD-6719 Echoes of the Louvin Brothers - Charlie Louvin
 VSD-6720 Running Scared - Mark Isham
 VSD-6721 Lost: Season 1 - Michael Giacchino
 VSD-6722 Inside Man - Terence Blanchard
 VSD-6723 The Pink Panther - Christophe Beck
 VSD-6724 Beach Music Sound: Sand in My Shoes - various artists
 VSD-6725 Ice Age: The Meltdown - John Powell
 VSD-6726 True Grit: The Classic Westerns of John Wayne - Elmer Bernstein (complete single disc reissue of both Best of John Wayne Westerns: Volumes 1 & 2 from 47000 series)
 VSD-6727 Retrospective - Tish Hinojosa
 VSD-6728 Because of You: The Love Songs Collection - Bobby Vinton
 VSD-6729 The Sentinel - Christophe Beck
 VSD-6730 Great Train Songs: An American Legend - Roy Acuff
 VSD-6731 Punk Rock! 20 Classics from the World of Mystic Records - various artists
 VSD-6732 The Last Stand - John Powell
 VSD-6733 Mission: Impossible III – Music by Michael Giacchino - Michael Giacchino
 VSD-6734 The Best of the Vogues - the Vogues
 VSD-6735 Scary Movie 4 - James L. Venable
 VSD-6736 The Omen (2006) - Marco Beltrami (Featuring Jerry Goldsmith's themes from the 1976 version)
 VSD-6737 Classic Cowboy Songs - Sons of the Pioneers
 VSD-6738 Year-Round Cowboy Songs for the Whole Year - Gene Autry
 VSD-6739 Stardust: The Bette Davis Story - Earl Rose
 VSD-6740 United 93 - John Powell
 VHV-6741 Johnny Tillotson Sings His All-Time Greatest Hits - Johnny Tillotson
 VSD-6742 Summer Beach Party - various artists
 VSD-6743 Stargate: The Deluxe Edition - David Arnold
 VSD-6744 The Philadelphia Years - Hall & Oates
 VSD-6745 Tokyo Drift - Brian Tyler (score album)
 VSD-6746 Monster House - Douglas Pipes
 VSD-6747 1980 Reunion Concert - the Ozark Mountain Daredevils
 VSD-6748 The Ant Bully - John Debney (score album)
 VSD-6749 Winners - Tommy Cash
 VSD-6750 Country Heart - John Conlee
 VSD-6751 Idlewild - John Debney (assigned a number, planned for release and cancelled. FYC promo exists)
 VSD-6752 John, the Wolfking of L.A. - John Phillips
 VSD-6753 The Republic Years - Sons of the Pioneers with Roy Rogers
 VSD-6754 Hollywoodland - Marcelo Zarvos (score album)
 VSD-6755 Gridiron Gang - Trevor Rabin
 VSD-6756 All the King's Men - James Horner
 VSD-6757 Complete Phil Spector Sessions - the Paris Sisters
 VSD-6758 Rudolph the Red-Nosed Reindeer and Other Christmas Favorites - Gene Autry
 VSD-6759 Lost: Season 2 - Michael Giacchino
 VSD-6760 The Texas Chainsaw Massacre: The Beginning - Steve Jablonsky
 VSD-6762 36 Unreleased Recordings from the Late '50s & Early '60s - Everly Brothers
 VSD-6763 Flyboys - Trevor Rabin
 VSD-6764 Texas Legend - Don Walser & the Pure Texas Band
 VSD-6765 Retrospective - the Derailers
 VSD-6766 Killer Rock 'n' Roll - Jerry Lee Lewis
 VSD-6767 Bluest Eyes - Storyville
 VHV-6768 A Night at the Ozarks: An Audiograph - the Dillards
 VSD-6769 Children of Men - John Tavener
 VSD-6770 The Malford Milligan Band Rides Again - Malford Milligan
 VSD-6771 The Grudge 2 - Christopher Young
 VSD-6772 24: Seasons 4 & 5 - Sean Callery
 VSD-6775 Wah-Wah - Patrick Doyle
 VSD-6776 Flicka - Aaron Zigman
 VSD3-6777 Franz Waxman: A Centenary Celebration - Joel McNeely & Frédéric Talgorn conduct
 VSD-6778 Night at the Museum - Alan Silvestri
 VSD-6779 We Are Marshall - Christophe Beck (score album)
 VSD-6780 Blood Diamond - James Newton Howard
 VSD-6781 The Good German - Thomas Newman
 VSD-6782 The Good Shepherd - Marcelo Zarvos / Bruce Fowler
 VSD-6783 The Pursuit of Happyness - Andrea Guerra
 VSD-6784 The Holiday - Hans Zimmer
 VSD-6785 Code Name: The Cleaner - George S. Clinton
 VSD-6786 Partition - Brian Tyler
 VSD-6787 Beat the Drum - Klaus Badelt / Ramin Djawadi
 VSD3-6788 Jerry Goldsmith: His Final Recordings (Looney Tunes / Star Trek: Nemesis / Timeline: unused score) - Jerry Goldsmith
 VSD-6789 Ghost Rider - Christopher Young
 VSD-6790 The Astronaut Farmer - Stuart Matthewman
 VSD-6791 Duets - Petula Clark
 VSD-6792 Robotech: The Shadow Chronicles - Scott Glasgow
 VSD-6793 Catch and Release - Brian Transeau / Tommy Stinton (score album)
 VHV-6794 Petula! - Petula Clark
 VSD-6795 Breach - Mychael Danna
 VSD-6796 Nomad: The Warrior - Carlo Siliotto
 VSD-6797 Couldn't Have Come at a Better Time: The Best of the Fenians - the Fenians
 VSD-6798 Snakes on a Plane - Trevor Rabin (score album)
 VSD-6799 Zodiac - David Shire (score album)
 VSD-6800 His Best - Tex Ritter
 VSD-6801 His Best - Johnny Bond
 VSD-6802 The Reaping - John Frizzell
 VHV-6803 1980 Reunion Concert: Rhythm & Joy - the Ozark Mountain Daredevils
 VSD-6804 Tumbling Tumbleweeds - Foy Willing & Riders of the Purple Sage
 VSD-6805 I Fall to Pieces: Ten Timeless Country Songs - various artists
 VSD-6806 Pathfinder: The Legend of the Ghost Warrior - Jonathan Elias
 VSD-6807 Grindhouse: Planet Terror - Robert Rodriguez (score album)
 VSD-6808 Premonition - Klaus Badelt
 VSD-6809 The Ultimate Gift - Mark McKenzie
 VSD3-6810 Miklós Rózsa: A Centenary Celebration - Elmer Bernstein, Joel McNeely & Cliff Eidelman conduct
 VSD-6811 Goodbye Bafana - Dario Marianelli (Colosseum Records release, planned for US release but released in Europe only)
 VSD-6812 Live at the Improv - Shelley Berman
 VSD2-6813 Down to Earth and High Cumberland Jubilee - Jimmy Buffett
 VSD-6814 Roy Acuff Sings Hank Williams - Roy Acuff
 VSD-6815 Collection (reissue) - the Chad Mitchell Trio
 VSD-6816 Then: Ultimate Rock Mix - various artists
 VSD-6818 The Lives of Others - Gabriel Yared / Stéphane Moucha
 VSD-6819 Jack of Diamonds - John Phillips
 VSD-6820 The Last Legion - Patrick Doyle
 VSD-6821 The Music of the Wild West - John McEuen
 VSD-6822 Lucky You - Christopher Young (Assigned a number, planned for release and cancelled. Composer promo exists)
 VSD-6823 The Classic Songs of Ray Price - Ray Price
 VSD-6824 Live Free or Die Hard - Marco Beltrami
 VSD-6825 Evan Almighty - John Debney (score album)
 VSD-6826 Shrek the Third - Harry Gregson-Williams (score album)
 VSD-6827 The Other Conquest - Samuel Zyman / Jorge Reyes
 VSD-6828 1408 - Gabriel Yared
 VSD-6829 Babylon 5: The Lost Tales - Christopher Franke
 VSD-6830 As You Like It - Patrick Doyle
 VSD-6831 Hostel: Part II - Nathan Barr
 VSD-6832 Toussaint - Allen Toussaint
 VSD-6833 I Know Who Killed Me - Joel McNeely
 VSD-6834 Rush Hour 3 - Lalo Schifrin
 VSD-6835 Side by Side - Faron Young & Ray Price
 VSD-6836 Night of Fear: A Collection of Spooky Novelty Songs - various artists
 VSD-6837 The Invasion - John Ottman
 VSD-6838 Balls of Fury - Randy Edelman (score album)
 VSD-6839 Prison Break - Ramin Djawadi
 VSD-6840 Shoot 'Em Up - Paul Haslinger
 VSD-6841 The Brave One - Dario Marianelli
 VSD-6842 The Kingdom - Danny Elfman
 VSD-6843 The Essential Masters - Ralph Stanley & the Clinch Mountain Boys
 VSD-6844 Down Home - the Coasters
 VSD-6845 Seven Miles Out of Town - Bob Wills & the Texas Playboys featuring Tommy Duncan
 VSD-6846 The Classic Songs of Spike Jones and His City Slickers - Spike Jones and His City Slickers
 VSD-6847 The Folk Hits Collection - the Highwaymen
 VSD-6848 A Crosby Christmas - Bing Crosby
 VSD-6849 Sea of Dreams - Luis Bacalov
 VSD-6850 Michael Clayton - James Newton Howard
 VSD-6851 The Bronze Age of Radio - the Credibility Gap
 VSD-6852 Rhapsodies for Young Lovers - the Midnight String Quartet
 VSD-6853 In the Valley of Elah - Mark Isham
 VSD-6854 Sleuth - Patrick Doyle
 VSD-6855 Return to House on Haunted Hill - Frederik Wiedmann
 VSD-6856 The Jane Austen Book Club - Aaron Zigman
 VSD-6857 The Best of Jerry Wallace - Jerry Wallace
 VSD-6858 30 Days of Night - Brian Reitzell (announced, assigned a catalog number and cancelled. Eventually released by Ipac Recordings)
 VSD-6859 Take My Album Please - Henny Youngman
 VSD-6860 Peace in the Valley: Country Gospel Favorites: Volume 1 - various artists
 VSD-6861 How Great Thou Art: Country Gospel Favorites: Volume 2 - various artists
 VSD-6862 Lions for Lambs - Mark Isham
 VSD-6863 Roy Rogers with the Sons of the Pioneers: The Centennial Collection
 VSD-6864 Mr. Magorium's Wonder Emporium - Alexandre Desplat / Aaron Zigman
 VSD-6865 Aliens vs. Predator: Requiem - Brian Tyler / Jerry Goldsmith, James Horner, Elliot Goldenthal, John Frizzell (themes)
 VSD-6866 Tin Man - Simon Boswell
 VSD-6867 The Tudors: Season 1 - Trevor Morris
 VSD-6868 Bury My Heart at Wounded Knee - George S. Clinton
 VSD-6869 The Great Debaters - James Newton Howard / Peter Golub (score album)
 VSD-6870 Charlie Wilson's War - James Newton Howard
 VSD-6872 Hand-Clapping Gospel Songs - Roy Acuff
 VSD-6873 The Mist - Mark Isham
 VSD-6874 American Gangster - Marc Streitenfeld (score album)
 VSD-6875 Water of Life: A Celtic Collection - the Highwaymen
 VSD-6876 When Irish Eyes Are Smiling - Bing Crosby
 VSD-6877 The Bucket List / Solo Piano Themes by Marc Shaiman - Marc Shaiman
 VSD-6878 I Am Legend - James Newton Howard
 VSD-6879 The Ventures Play Their Greatest Hits - the Ventures
 VSD-6880 Greatest: The Singles Collection - Argent
 VSD-6881 27 Dresses - Randy Edelman
 VSD-6882 Miss Pettigrew Lives for a Day - Paul Englishby
 VSD-6883 Vantage Point - Atli Örvarsson
 VSD-6884 The Other Boleyn Girl - Paul Cantelon
 VSD-6885 Fool's Gold - George Fenton
 VSD-6886 Stop-Loss - John Powell
 VSD-6887 Leatherheads - Randy Newman
 VSD-6888 Dr. Seuss' Horton Hears A Who! - John Powell
 VSD-6889 Nim's Island - Patrick Doyle
 VSD-6890 The Visitor - Jan A. P. Kaczmarek
 VSD-6891 P.S. I Love You - John Powell (score album)
 VSD2-6892 Lost: Season 3 - Michael Giacchino
 VSD-6893 John Adams - Rob Lane / Joseph Vitarelli
 VSD-6894 Cowboy Hymns and Songs of Inspiration - Gene Autry
 VSD-6895 From Genesis to Revelation - Genesis
 VSD-6896 The Best of Julius La Rosa - Julius La Rosa
 VSD-6897 Standard Operating Procedure - Danny Elfman
 VSD-6898 Speed Racer - Michael Giacchino
 VSD-6899 Western Hymns and Spirituals - the Sons of the Pioneers
 VSD4-6900 A 30th-Anniversary Celebration - various artists
 VSD-6901 The Happening - James Newton Howard
 VSD-6902 Mongol - Tuomas Kantelinen
 VSD-6903 Pussycat - John Phillips
 VSD-6904 Get Smart - Trevor Rabin
 VSD-6905 Songs from His Famous Radio Broadcasts - Bing Crosby
 VSD-6906 Meet Dave - John Debney
 VSD-6907 20 Classic Songs of Tommy Overstreet - Tommy Overstreet
 VSD-6908 Hancock - John Powell
 VSD-6909 Timeless: The Classic Concert Performances - Roy Clark
 VSD-6910 Hellboy II: The Golden Army - Danny Elfman
 VSD-6915 She's About a Mover: Complete Singles 1964-1967 - Sir Douglas Quintet
 VSD-6916 The Mummy: Tomb of the Dragon Emperor - Randy Edelman
 VSD-6917 Just You Wait - Walter Scott
 VSD-6918 The Sisterhood of the Traveling Pants 2 - Rachel Portman (score album)
 VSD-6919 The Girl from U.N.C.L.E. - Dave Grusin / Jerry Goldsmith
 VSD-6920 Greatest Hits 1973-1985 - Gladys Knight & the Pips
 VSD-6921 Traitor - Mark Kilian
 VSD-6922 Fly Me to the Moon - Ramin Djawadi
 VSD-6923 Body of Lies - Marc Streitenfeld
 VSD-6924 Nights in Rodanthe - Jeanine Tesori (score album)
 VSD-6925 Babylon A.D. - Atli Örvarsson
 VSD-6926 Igor - Patrick Doyle
 VSD-6927 Eagle Eye - Brian Tyler
 VSD-6928 Plant and See - Plant and See
 VSD-6929 Che - Alberto Iglesias
 VSD-6930 Passengers - Edward Shearmur
 VSD-6931 Pride and Glory - Mark Isham
 VSD-6932 Pushing Daisies - James Dooley
 VSD-6933 Flash of Genius - Aaron Zigman
 VSD-6934 Changeling - Clint Eastwood
 VSD-6935 Righteous Kill - Edward Shearmur (Assigned a number, planned for release and cancelled)
 VSD-6936 24: Redemption - Sean Callery
 VSD-6937 Valkyrie - John Ottman
 VSD-6938 The Day the Earth Stood Still - Tyler Bates
 VSD-6939 Live at the Blues Warehouse - Foghat
 VSD-6940 Keith Emerson Band - Keith Emerson Band featuring Marc Bonilla
 VSD-6941 Seven Pounds - Angelo Milli
 VSD-6942 Frost/Nixon - Hans Zimmer
 VSD-6943 Largo Winch - Alexandre Desplat (Colosseum Records release, Europe only)
 VSD-6944 Family Joules - Foghat
 VSD-6946 The International - Tom Tykwer / Reinhold Heil / Johnny Klimek
 VSD-6947 Taking Chance - Marcelo Zarvos
 VSD-6948 The Lazarus Project - Brian Tyler
 VSD-6949 Their Very Best - the Amazing Rhythm Aces
 VSD-6950 Myrtle Beach Days: The Classic Sound of Beach Music - various artists
 VSD-6951 The Gene Generation - Scott Glasgow
 VSD-6952 Phoebe in Wonderland - Christophe Beck
 VSD-6954 Dragonball Evolution - Brian Tyler
 VSD-6955 Duplicity - James Newton Howard
 VSD-6956 Knowing - Marco Beltrami
 VSD-6957 Vande Mataram - A. R. Rahman
 VSD-6958 Crossing Over - Mark Isham
 VSD-6959 The Tudors: Season 2 - Trevor Morris
 VSD-6960 Fast & Furious - Brian Tyler (score album)
 VSD-6961 Chéri - Alexandre Desplat
 VSD-6962 Our Little Planet - Tish Hinojosa
 VSD-6963 Grey Gardens - Rachel Portman
 VSD-6964 Lost: Season 4 - Michael Giacchino
 VSD-6965 Andy Warhol Presents Man on the Moon - John Phillips
 VSD-6966 Star Trek - Michael Giacchino
 VSD-6967 X-Men Origins: Wolverine - Harry Gregson-Williams
 VSD-6968 Coco avant Chanel (Coco Before Chanel US title) - Alexandre Desplat
 VSD-6969 Night at the Museum: Battle of the Smithsonian - Alan Silvestri
 VSD-6970 The Very Best of David Frizzell & Shelley West - David Frizzell & Shelley West
 VSD-6973 Prison Break: Seasons 3 & 4 - Ramin Djawadi
 VSD-6975 Land of the Lost - Michael Giacchino
 VSD-6977 My Sister's Keeper - Aaron Zigman (score album)
 VSD-6978 Ice Age: Dawn of the Dinosaurs - John Powell
 VSD-6980 G.I. Joe: The Rise of Cobra - Alan Silvestri
 VSD-6981 Orphan - John Ottman
 VSD-6982 Aliens in the Attic - John Debney
 VSD-6983 The Final Destination - Brian Tyler
 VSD-6984 True Blood - Nathan Barr
 VSD-6985 The Hills Run Red - Frederik Wiedmann
 VSD-6986 Whiteout - John Frizzell
 VSD-6989 Astro Boy - John Ottman
 VSD-6990 The Vampire's Assistant - Stephen Trask
 VSD-6991 Children of the Corn (2009) - Jonathan Elias / Nathanel Morgan
 VSD-6992 44 Inch Chest - Angelo Badalamenti / 100 Suns
 VSD-6993 Cracks - Javier Navarrete (Colosseum Records release, Europe only)
 VSD-6994 Amelia - Gabriel Yared
 VSD-6995 The Fourth Kind - Atli Örvarsson
 VSD-6996 The Prisoner - Rupert Gregson-Williams
 VSD-6997 Alice - Ben Mink
 VSD-6998 The Last Station - Sergey Yevtushenko
 VSD-6999 Everybody's Fine - Dario Marianelli
 VSD-7000 Revolution - John Corigliano
 VSD-7001 It's Complicated - Hans Zimmer & Heitor Pereira (Announced and immediately cancelled by Zimmer due to the brevity of the score (17 minutes). Released digitally through Back Lot Music)
 VSD-7002 Leap Year - Randy Edelman
 VSD-7003 Tooth Fairy - George S. Clinton
 VSD-7004 The Blackwood Brothers - the Blackwood Brothers
 VSD-7005 Hovie Lister and the Statesmen - Hovie Lister and the Statesmen
 VSD-7007 The Ghost Writer - Alexandre Desplat
 VSD-7008 South of the Border: Songs of Old Mexico - Gene Autry
 VSD-7009 The Crazies - Mark Isham
 VSD-7010 The Wolfman - Danny Elfman
 VSD-7011 Green Zone - John Powell
 VSD-7012 How to Train Your Dragon - John Powell
 VSD-7013 Fringe - Michael Giacchino, Chris Tilton & Chad Seitzer
 VSD-7014 Brooklyn's Finest - Marcelo Zarvos
 VSD-7015 Nanny McPhee Returns - James Newton Howard
 VSD-7016 Many Mamas, Many Papas - John Phillips
 VSD-7017 Still Rovin' After All These Years - the Irish Rovers
 VSD-7018 Tripping the Velvet - Annie Minogue Band (digital only)
 VSD-7020 Robin Hood - Marc Streitenfeld
 VSD-7021 Mother and Child - Edward Shearmur
 VSD-7022 Sing the Stephen Foster Songbook - Sons of the Pioneers
 VSD-7023 The Essential Sun Records Country Hits - Jerry Lee Lewis
 VSD-7024 Shrek Forever After - Harry Gregson-Williams (score album)
 VSD-7025 Lost: Season 5 - Michael Giacchino
 VSD-7026 Palindrome - Billy Cobham
 VSD-7027 Songs of Inspiration - Brenda Lee
 VSD-7028 Songs of Inspiration - Wilma Lee & Stoney Cooper
 VSD-7029 Songs of Inspiration - the Jordanaires
 VSD-7030 In Jesus' Eyes - Ed Bruce
 VSD-7032 The A-Team - Alan Silvestri
 VSD-7033 Marmaduke - Christopher Lennertz
 VSD-7034 Knight and Day - John Powell
 VSD-7035 The Special Relationship - Alexandre Desplat (assigned a number, planned for release and cancelled. Released as part of the Limited Edition series)
 VSD-7036 The Last Word in Jesus is Us - Roy Clark
 VSD-7037 Charlie St. Cloud - Rolfe Kent
 VSD-7039 The Tudors: Season 3 - Trevor Morris
 VSD-7040 Lost: The Final Season - Michael Giacchino
 VSD-7041 Cats & Dogs: The Revenge of Kitty Galore - Christopher Lennertz (score album)
 VSD-7042 Live! From Texas - the Derailers
 VSD-7043 Never Let Me Go - Rachel Portman
 VSD-7044 True Blood: Season 2 - Nathan Barr
 VSD-7045 Spartacus: Blood and Sand - Joseph LoDuca
 VSD-7046 Labour of Love IV - UB40
 VSD-7047 The Pillars of the Earth - Trevor Morris
 VSD-7048 Hachi: A Dog's Tale - Jan A. P. Kaczmarek
 VSD-7049 The Tudors: Season 4 - Trevor Morris
 VSD-7050 Moscow - the Keith Emerson Band featuring Marc Bonilla
 VSD-7051 Get Low - Jan A. P. Kaczmarek (score album)
 VSD-7052 Music for Film and Television - Angelo Badalamenti
 VSD-7053 Let Me In - Michael Giacchino
 VSD-7057 Skyline - Matthew Margeson
 VSD-7058 Little Fockers - Stephen Trask
 VSD-7059 20th Century Fox: 75 Years of Great Film Music - various artists
 VSD-7060 Pushing Daisies: Season 2 - James Dooley
 VSD-7062 The Way Back - Burkhard Dallwitz
 VSD-7063 Sanctum - David Hirschfelder
 VSD-7064 Unknown - John Ottman & Alexander Rudd
 VSD-7065 Songs of Inspiration - Ray Price
 VSD-7066 The Pacific Flow to Abbey Road - Randy Edelman
 VSD-7067 Fringe: Season 2 - Chris Tilton
 VSD-7068 Los Angeles - Brian Tyler
 VSD-7069 Ironclad - Lorne Balfe (Colosseum Records release, Europe only)
 VSD-7070 La Ligne droite - Patrick Doyle (Colosseum Records release, Europe only)
 VSD-7071 Your Highness - Steve Jablonsky
 VSD-7072 Largo Winch II - Alexandre Desplat (Colosseum Records release, Europe only)
 VSD-7073 Moscow - Keith Emerson Band featuring Marc Bonilla
 VSD-7074 Songs of Inspiration - the Wilburn Brothers
 VSD-7075 The Tourist - James Newton Howard
 VSD-7076 Gulliver's Travels - Henry Jackman
 VSD-7077 Songs of Inspiration - Buck Owens & the Buckaroos
 VSD-7078 The Very Best of Buck Owens & Susan Raye - Buck Owens & Susan Raye
 VSD-7079 The Princess of Montpensier - Philippe Sarde
 VSD-7080  - Gustavo Santaolalla (Colosseum Records release, Europe only)
 VSD-7081 The Very Best of Wanda Jackson - Wanda Jackson
 VSD-7082 Hop - Christopher Lennertz (score album)
 VSD-7083 Scream 4 - Marco Beltrami (score album)
 VSD-7084 Rio - John Powell (score album)
 VSD-7085 La Fille du puisatier - Alexandre Desplat (Colosseum Records release, Europe only)
 VSD-7086 Mildred Pierce - Carter Burwell
 VSD-7087 The Very Best of Dan Seals - Dan Seals
 VSD-7088 Fast Five - Brian Tyler (score album)
 VSD-7089 Camelot - Mychael Danna & Jeff Danna
 VSD-7090 I Am Number Four - Trevor Rabin
 VSD-7091 The Borgias - Trevor Morris
 VSD-7092 Kung Fu Panda 2 - Hans Zimmer & John Powell
 VSD-7093 The Best of Angel Voices - the St. Philip's Boys Choir
 VSD-7094 The Man They Call Mr. Piano Plays Romantic Melodies of Our Time - Roger Williams
 VSD-7095 The Family Way - Paul McCartney
 VSD-7096 The Very Best of Earl Klugh: The Blue Note Years - Earl Klugh
 VSD-7097 Game of Thrones - Ramin Djawadi
 VSD-7098 Another Year - Gary Yershon
 VSD-7099 The First Grader - Alex Heffes
 VSD-7100 Monte Carlo - Michael Giacchino
 VSD-7101 Super 8 - Michael Giacchino
 VSD-7102 Too Big to Fail - Marcelo Zarvos
 VSD-7103 Mr. Popper's Penguins - Rolfe Kent
 VSD-7104 Jig - Patrick Doyle
 VSD-7105 Cowboys & Aliens - Harry Gregson-Williams
 VSD-7106 Rise of the Planet of the Apes - Patrick Doyle
 VSD-7107 The Classic Songs of Dickey Lee - Dickey Lee
 VSD-7108 The Wilburn Brothers Show - the Wilburn Brothers
 VSD-7109 Final Destination 5 - Brian Tyler
 VSD-7110 John Carpenter's The Ward - Mark Kilian
 VSD-7111 Fright Night - Ramin Djawadi
 VSD-7112 Soundtrack - Dwight Twilley
 VSD-7113 Are You Ready?: Sweet Live - the Sweet
 VSD-7114 The Help - Thomas Newman (score album)
 VSD-7115 Dream House - John Debney
 VSD-7116 The Thing - Marco Beltrami
 VSD-7117 Johnny English Reborn - Ilan Eshkeri
 VSD-7118 The Centennial Collection - Roy Rogers with the Sons of the Pioneers
 VSD-7119 Lost Weekend: The Best of Wall of Voodoo (The I.R.S Years) - Wall of Voodoo
 VSD-7120 Dolphin Tale - Mark Isham
 VSD-7121 Tower Heist - Christophe Beck
 VSD-7122 Real Steel - Danny Elfman (score album)
 VSD-7123 The Ides of March - Alexandre Desplat
 VSD-7124 Will - Nigel Clarke and Michael Csányi-Wills (Colosseum Records release, Europe only)
 VSD-7125 A Very Harold & Kumar 3D Christmas - William Ross (score album)
 VSD-7126 Albert Nobbs - Brian Byrne
 VSD-7127 Power Play - Billy Cobham
 VSD-7128 Mission: Impossible – Ghost Protocol - Michael Giacchino
 VSD-7129 Reflections of Life - Dale Evans
 VSD-7130 Golden Inspirational Hymns - Roger Williams
 VSD-7131 Big Miracle - Cliff Eidelman
 VSD-7132 Fringe: Season 3 - Chris Tilton
 VSD-7133 In the Land of Blood and Honey - Gabriel Yared / various artists
 VSD-7134 Black Gold - James Horner (Day of the Falcon US title)
 VSD-7135 There Be Dragons: Secretos de Pasión - Robert Folk
 VSD-7136 Gracious Days - the Demolition String Band featuring Elena Skye and Boo Reiners
 VSD-7137 Safe House - Ramin Djawadi
 VSD-7138 Dr. Seuss' The Lorax - John Powell (score album)
 VSD-7139 Spartacus: Vengeance - Joseph LoDuca
 VSD-7140 Jacaranda - Trevor Rabin
 VSD-7141 Coriolanus - Ilan Eshkeri
 VSD-7142 Bel Ami - Lakshman Joseph de Saram & Rachel Portman
 VSD-7143 Brake - Brian Tyler
 VSD-7144 Green Blimp - Dwight Twilley
 VSD-7145 The Cabin in the Woods - David Julyan
 VSD-7146 Battleship - Steve Jablonsky
 VSD-7147 Picture This - Billy Cobham (GRP Records reissue)
 VSD-7148 Game of Thrones: Season 2 - Ramin Djawadi
 VSD-7149 Touchback - William Ross
 VSD-7150 Warning - Billy Cobham (GRP Records reissue)
 VSD-7151 Hemingway & Gellhorn - Javier Navarrete
 VSD-7152 Ice Age: Continental Drift - John Powell
 VSD-7153 The Chorus (Les Choristes) - Bruno Coulais (reissue)
 VSD-7154 Savages - Adam Peters / various artists
 VSD-7155 It's Your Night - James Ingram
 VSD-7156 The Adventurers - Quincy Jones and the Ray Brown Orchestra (LP reissue)
 VSD-7157 Basie and Beyond  - the Quincy Jones - Sammy Nestico Orchestra
 VSD-7158 The Bourne Legacy - James Newton Howard
 VSD-7159 Samsara - Michael Stearns, Lisa Gerrard & Marcello De Francisci
 VSD-7160 Baraka: The Deluxe Edition - Michael Stearns
 VSD-7161 High Ground - Chris Bacon (announced, assigned catalog number and cancelled. Digital release only)
 VSD-7162 The Apparition - Tomandandy
 VSD-7163 For Greater Glory: The True Story of Cristiada - James Horner
 VSD-7164 Person of Interest - Ramin Djawadi
 VSD-7165 Three Fates Project - the Keith Emerson Band
 VSD-7166 The Very Best of Adrian Legg - Adrian Legg
 VSD-7167 Winged Migration - Bruno Coulais (reissue)
 VSD-7168 Bad Karma - Bryce Jacobs (Colosseum Records release, Europe only)
 VSD-7169 Trouble with the Curve - Marco Beltrami
 VSD-7170 Parade's End - Dirk Brossé (Colosseum Records release, Europe only)
 VSD-7171 Christmas Songs - Roberta Flack
 VSD-7172 Fringe: Season 4 - Chris Tilton
 VSD-7173 Sinister - Christopher Young
 VSD-7174 Shadow Dancer - Dickon Hinchliffe (Colosseum Records release, Europe only)
 VSD-7175 Rise of the Guardians - Alexandre Desplat
 VSD-7177 Microcosmos - Bruno Coulais (reissue)
 VSD-7178 Gangster Squad - Steve Jablonsky (score album)
 VSD-7179 Parker - David Buckley
 VSD-7180 Bullet to the Head - Steve Mazzaro
 VSD-7181 Transmigration Macabre - Ravi Shankar
 VSD-7182 Side Effects - Thomas Newman
 VSD-7183 There Are But Four Small Faces - Small Faces
 VSD-7184 Spartacus: War of the Damned - Joseph LoDuca
 VSD-7185 Varèse Sarabande: A 35th Anniversary Celebration
 VSD-7186 Show Boat: A London Studio Cast Recording - music By Jerome Kern, lyrics By Oscar Hammerstein II
 VSD-7188 The Idolmaker - Jeff Barry
 VSD-7189 Himalaya - Bruno Coulais
 VSD-7190 G.I. Joe: Retaliation - Henry Jackman
 VSD-7191 House of Cards - Jeff Beal
 VSD-7192 Dead Man Down - Jacob Groth
 VSD-7193 Pain & Gain - Steve Jablonsky
 VSD-7194 Impressions of America - Patrick Doyle
 VSD-7195 Flash Harry - Harry Nilsson
 VSD-7196 Fringe: Season 5 - Chris Tilton
 VSD-7197 Stuck in Love - Mike Mogis & Nate Walcott / various artists
 VSD-7198 Star Trek Into Darkness - Michael Giacchino
 VSD-7200 1985 at the Movies - David Newman and the Varèse Symphony Orchestra (Disc 1 of the six-CD Back in Time ... 1985 at the Movies)
 VSD-7203 Copperhead - Laurent Eyquem
 VSD-7204 The Boys Club: Live From California: The Complete Concert - Keith Emerson, Glenn Hughes & Marc Bonilla
 VSD-7205 The Hangover Trilogy (Features music from The Hangover, The Hangover Part II and The Hangover Part III) - Christophe Beck
 VSD-7206 Mull of Kintyre - the Campbeltown Pipe Band
 VSD-7207 Beatles to Bond and Bach - George Martin & His Orchestra
 VSD-7208 No Place on Earth - John Piscitello (announced, assigned catalog number and cancelled. Digital release only)
 VSD-7209 One Track Heart - J Mascis & Devadas
 VSD-7210 White House Down - Thomas Wander & Harald Kloser
 VSD-7211 The Smurfs 2 - Heitor Pereira (score album)
 VSD-7212 Elysium - Ryan Amon
 VSD-7213 Evidence - Atli Örvarsson (Amazon on demand title. Digital & CDR release)
 VSD-7214 Imogene - Rob Simonsen (US direct to digital title Girl Most Likely) (Amazon on demand title, digital & CDR release)
 VSD-7215 After the Fair - Tish Hinojosa
 VSD-7216 Adore - Christopher Gordon / Antony Partos
 VSD-7217 Hemlock Grove - Nathan Barr
 VSD-7219 The Ultimate Life - Mark McKenzie
 VSD-7220 Standing Up - Brian Tyler
 VSD-7221 Getaway - Justin Burnett (limited)
 VSD-7222 A Boy Named Charlie Brown - Rod McKuen (First time on CD)
 VSD-7226 Captain Phillips - Henry Jackman
 VSD-7227 Ender's Game - Steve Jablonsky
 VSD-7229 Person of Interest: Season 2 - Ramin Djawadi
 VSD-7233 Arrested Development - David Schwartz / various artists
 VSD-7234 Last Vegas - Mark Mothersbaugh / various artists
 VSD-7236 Any Which Way You Can - various artists (Reissue of Warner Bros. Records LP)
 VSD-7237 Honkytonk Man - various artists (Reissue of Warner Bros. Records LP)
 VSD-7238 Sharky's Machine - various artists (Reissue of Warner Bros. Records LP)
 VSD-7239 Strike Back - Scott Shields
 VSD-7240 Oldboy - Roque Baños
 VSD-7241 Hours - Benjamin Wallfisch
 VSD-7242 Jack Ryan: Shadow Recruit - Patrick Doyle
 VSD-7245 Ride Along - Christopher Lennertz
 VSD-7246 47 Ronin - Ilan Eshkeri
 VSD-7247 Drive Hard - Bryce Jacobs (Amazon on demand CDR & digital download release)
 VSD-7248 Lock Up - Bill Conti (Limited reissue of Intrada Special Collection title)
 VSD-7250 That Awkward Moment - David Torn / various artists
 VSD-7251 Non-Stop - John Ottman / Edwin Wendler
 VSD-7252 The Railway Man - David Hirschfelder
 VSD-7253 Songs Our Daddy Taught Us - the Everly Brothers
 VSD-7255 Enough Said - Marcelo Zarvos
 VSD-7256 After the Dark (The Philosophers) - Nicholas O'Toole and Jonathan Davis
 VSD-7257 The Right Kind of Wrong - Rachel Portman
 VSD-7258 Porky's Revenge! - various artists (Reissue of Mobile Fidelity & Sony Legacy CDs)
 VSD-7259 Shameless - various artists
 VSD-7262 One on One - Charles Fox / Seals and Crofts (LP reissue)
 VSD-7263 Oculus - the Newton Brothers
 VSD-7266 R.I.P. - the Zombies
 VSD-7267 Bates Motel - Chris Bacon
 VSD-7268 Who Is Killing the Great Chefs of Europe? - Henry Mancini (Limited reissue of MCA Records LP)
 VSD-7270 The Quiet Ones - Lucas Vidal
 VSD-7271 House of Cards: Season 2 - Jeff Beal
 VSD-7272 Need for Speed - Nathan Furst (score album)
 VSD-7273 The Long Night - Michael Bradford
 VSD-7274 Dan Curtis' Dracula - Bob Cobert
 VSD-7278 Belle - Rachel Portman
 VSD-7279 Calvary - Patrick Cassidy
 VSD-7280 Hidden Moon - Luis Bacalov / various artists
 VSD-7284 The Signal - Nima Fakhrara
 VSD-7286 Whiplash - Justin Hurwitz, Tim Simonec / various artists
 VSD-7287 Ninjago: Masters of Spinjitzu - Jay Vincent & Michael Kramer
 VSD-7292 Into the Storm - Brian Tyler
 VSD-7294 The Equalizer - Harry Gregson-Williams
 VSD-7295 The November Man - Marco Beltrami
 VSD-7296 Snowpiercer - Marco Beltrami
 VSD-7297 A Walk Among the Tombstones - Carlos Rafael Rivera
 VSD-7298 Penny Dreadful: Season 1 - Abel Korzeniowski
 VSD-7299 Chuck - Tim Jones
 VSD-7303 The Loft - John Frizzell
 VSD-7305 Addicted - Aaron Zigman
 VSD-7306 The Hero of Color City - Zoe Poledouris-Roche / Angel Roche
 VSD-7307 Revenge of the Green Dragons - Mark Kilian
 VSD-7308 Fury - Steven Price
 VSD-7309 John Wick - Tyler Bates / Joel J. Richard / various artists
 VSD-7312 Elmer Bernstein: The Wild Side - Elmer Bernstein / Big Band de Canarias
 VSD-7314 Orange Is the New Black - Gwendolyn Sanford, Brandon Jay & Scott Doherty
 VSD-7315 Keep On Keepin' On - Justin Kauflin / Quincy Jones / various artists
 VSD-7317 The Homesman - Marco Beltrami
 VSD-7318 Mr. Turner - Gary Yershon
 VSD-7319 Woman in Black 2: Angel of Death - Marco Beltrami, Marcus Trumpp & Brandon Roberts
 VSD-7320 Night at the Museum: Secret of the Tomb - Alan Silvestri
 VSD-7321 Orphan Black - Trevor Yuile (score album)
 VSD-7322 Orphan Black - various artists
 VSD-7323 The Newsroom - Thomas Newman / Jeff Beal (announced, assigned a catalog number and cancelled)
 VSD-7324 The Boy Next Door - Randy Edelman / Nathan Barr
 VSD-7325 Virunga - Patrick Jonsson (limited)
 VSD-7327 The Great Human Odyssey - Darren Fung
 VSD-7340 Desert Dancer - Benjamin Wallfisch
 VSD-7342 At Long Last Love - Cole Porter
 VSD-7343 The Music of Patrick Doyle: Piano Solo - Patrick Doyle
 VSD-7344 Jane Got a Gun - Lisa Gerrard / Marcello De Francisci (announced, assigned a catalog number and cancelled)
 VSD-7345 Killer Klowns from Outer Space: Reimagined - John Massari (re-recording)
 VSD-7348 I Am Big Bird: The Caroll Spinney Story - Joshua Johnson
 VSD-7349 The Woman Astronaut - Penka Kouneva
 VSD-7353 12 Monkeys - Trevor Rabin / Paul Linford
 VSD-7354 Jonathan Strange & Mr Norrell - Benoît Charest / Benoît Groulx
 VSD-7355 The Librarians - Joseph LoDuca
 VSD-7356 Self/less - Antônio Pinto / Dudu Aram
 VSD-7359 Pixels - Henry Jackman
 VSD-7360 Maggie - David Wingo (Digital download release, CD was planned but cancelled)
 VSD-7363 House of Cards: Season 3 - Jeff Beal
 VSD-7364 Extinction - Sergio Moure de Oteyza (limited)
 VSD-7365 Z For Zachariah - Heather McIntosh
 VSD-7368 Everest - Dario Marianelli
 VSD-7369 Sicario - Jóhann Jóhannsson
 VSD-7370 Jenny's Wedding - Brian Byrne
 VSD-7371 A Walk in the Woods - Nathan Larson / various artists
 VSD-7373 Rock the Kasbah - Marcelo Zarvos / various artists
 VSD-7374 The Affair - Marcelo Zarvos
 VSD-7377 Momentum - Laurent Eyquem
 VSD-7380 Carol - Carter Burwell / various artists
 VSD-7381 Ray Donovan - Marcelo Zarvos / various artists
 VSD-7383 Truth - Brian Tyler
 VSD-7384 The Final Girls - Gregory James Jenkins
 VSD-7585 Steve McQueen: The Man & Le Mans - Jim Copperthwaite
 VSD-7386 Flesh and Bone - Dave Porter
 VSD-7387 Ash vs Evil Dead - Joseph LoDuca
 VSD-7388 Remember - Mychael Danna
 VSD-7392 Pride and Prejudice and Zombies - Fernando Velázquez
 VSD-7393 Person of Interest: Seasons 3 & 4 - Ramin Djawadi
 VSD-7395 The Electric Horseman - Dave Grusin / Willie Nelson (Reissue of Columbia Records CD)
 VSD-7397 Star Trek Beyond - Michael Giacchino
 VSD-7398 Jesse Stone: The Ultimate Collection - Jeff Beal
 VSD-7399 House of Cards: Season 4 - Jeff Beal
 VSD-7401 Gods of Egypt - Marco Beltrami
 VSD-7402 Revelation - Neal Acree
 VSD-7407 American Flyers - Lee Ritenour / Greg Mathieson (First time on CD)
 VSD-7411 Nighthawks - Keith Emerson
 VSD-7412 Before I Wake - the Newton Brothers & Danny Elfman (Originally intended for public release, now a limited title)
 VSD-7413 Eddie the Eagle - Matthew Margeson
 VSD-7419 Foul Play - Charles Fox (reissue)
 VSD-7420 The Champ - Dave Grusin (First time on CD)
 VSD-7425 Roots: The Saga of an American Family - Quincy Jones (Reissue of A&M Records CD)
 VSD-7426 Pee-wee's Big Holiday - Mark Mothersbaugh
 VSD-7427 Good Times - Sonny Bono & Cher
 VSD-7428 Voices - Jimmy Webb (First time on CD)
 VSD-7429 Z: The Beginning of Everything - Marcelo Zarvos
 VSD-7430 Popeye: The Deluxe Edition - Harry Nilsson / various artists (First time on CD in a complete two-disc edition)
 VSD-7436 Barbarella - Charles Fox & Bob Crewe (First time on CD)
 VSD-7438 Now You See Me 2 - Brian Tyler
 VSD-7439 Howard Lovecraft and the Frozen Kingdom - George Streicher
 VSD-7441 City Heat - Lennie Niehaus / various artists (Reissue of Warner Bros. Records LP)
 VSD-7445 Ice Age: Collision Course - John Debney
 VSD-7446 Their Finest - Rachel Portman
 VSD-7447 The 9th Life of Louis Drax - Patrick Watson
 VSD-7448 Electronic Meditation - Tangerine Dream
 VSD-7450 The Very Best of England Dan & John Ford Coley
 VSD-7452 Sully - Clint Eastwood, Christian Jacob and the Tierney Sutton Band
 VSD-7453 Abzû - Austin Wintory
 VSD-7458 Hacksaw Ridge - Rupert Gregson-Williams
 VSD-7459 Wheeler - Stephen Dorff / various artists
 VSD-7460 Penny Dreadful: Seasons 2 & 3 - Abel Korzeniowski
 VSD-7469 Muhammad Ali: The Greatest - Michael Masser / George Benson (reissue)
 VSD-7471 XXX: Return of Xander Cage - Brian Tyler & Robert Lydecker
 VSD-7472 John Wick: Chapter 2 - Tyler Bates & Joel J. Richard / various artists
 VSD-7454 Orange Sunshine - Matt Costa
 VSD-7475 The Man in the High Castle: Seasons 1 & 2 - Henry Jackman & Dominic Lewis
 VSD-7476 Sleepless - Michael Kamm & Jaro Messerschmidt
 VSD-7477 The Man from Snowy River and Other Themes for Piano - Bruce Rowland
 VSD-7478 John Williams: Themes and Transcriptions for Piano - John Williams / Simone Pedroni
 VSD-7482 Gold - various artists
 VSD-7483 The Founder - Carter Burwell
 VSD-7484 Power Rangers - Brian Tyler
 VSD-7485 A United Kingdom - Patrick Doyle
 VSD-7486 On Golden Pond - Dave Grusin (Reissue of MCA Records LP - includes dialog by Katharine Hepburn and Henry Fonda)
 VSD-7487 Julie's Greenroom - Ryan Shore & Julie Andrews
 VSD-7488 Bosch - Jesse Voccia
 VSD-7490 The House - Andrew Feltenstein & John Nau / various artists
 VSD-7494 22 - Lisa Gerrard & James Orr
 VSD-7495 Thief of Hearts - Giorgio Moroder & Harold Faltermeyer / various artists (Reissue of Casablanca Records CD)
 VSD-7501 The Big Sick - Michael Andrews / various artists
 VSD2-7504 House of Cards: Season 5 - Jeff Beal
 VSD-7505 The Putin Interviews - Jeff Beal (limited)
 VSD-7507 Harper Valley P.T.A. - various artists (LP reissue)
 VSD-7508 Kodachrome - Agatha Kaspar
 VSD-7509 Jasmine - Shie Rozow (Limited to 300 copies and also included and intended to start a "Signature Series" which included autographed booklets with each CD. It is the only title in that series which has been cancelled)
 VSD-7511 Shimmer Lake - Joseph Trapanese (limited)
 VSD-7512 E.B. White's Charlotte's Web - Richard M. Sherman & Robert B. Sherman (CD reissue)
 VSD2-7514 Gypsy: Season 1 - Jeff Beal (limited)
 VSD-7516 American Assassin - Steven Price
 VSD-7519 12 Monkeys: Season 3 - Stephen Barton
 VSD-7522 Loveless - Evgueni and Sacha Galperine
 VSD-7523 Jean-Michel Bernard Plays Lalo Schifrin - Lalo Schifrin / Jean-Michel Bernard
 VSD-7524 Cello - Randy Kerber
 VSD-7525 The Limehouse Golem - Johan Söderqvist (limited)
 VSD-7527 American Made - Christophe Beck / various artists
 VSD-7528 Breathe - Nitin Sawhney
 VSD-7529 Hampstead - Stephen Warbeck (limited)
 VSD-7530 Smokey and the Bandit: 40th Anniversary - Bill Justis / various artists & Smokey and the Bandit II - various artists (Reissue of MCA Records LPs)
 VSD-7532 Sounder - Taj Mahal (Reissue of MCA Records CD)
 VSD-7535 Tooth and Tail - Austin Wintory
 VSD-7536 Three Billboards Outside Ebbing, Missouri - Carter Burwell / various artists
 VSD-7540 The Nut Job 2: Nutty by Nature - Heitor Pereira (limited)
 VSD-7541 Only the Brave - Joseph Trapanese
 VSD-7543 Chappaquiddick - Garth Stevenson
 VSD-7545 Jungle - Johnny Klimek
 VSD-7547 24 Hours to Live - Tyler Bates
 VSD-7550 The Rebirth of Id - Penka Kouneva
 VSD-7554 Fletch - Harold Faltermeyer / various artists (Reissue of MCA Records LP)
 VSD-7555 Hangman - Frederik Wiedmann
 VSD-7556 Knight Rider - Stu Phillips (Limited two-disc expansion of original 2005 Film Score Monthly limited edition CD and more unreleased music)
 VSD-7557 The Commuter - Roque Baños
 VSD-7559 Into the Badlands - David Shephard
 VSD-7560 Sirens: Music Inspired by Homer's Odyssey - Craig Safan
 VSD-7562 Submergence - Fernando Velázquez
 VSD-7563 Wilson's Heart - Christopher Young
 VSD-7564 Ghost Stories - Frank Ilfman
 VSD-7565 Life of the Party - Fil Eisler / various artists
 VSD-7567 The Strangers: Prey at Night - Adrian Johnston
 VSD-7568 I Kill Giants - Laurent Perez Del Mar
 VSD-7569 Into the Badlands: Season 2 - Trevor Yuile
 VSD-7570 Nostalgia - Laurent Eyquem
 VSD-7571 Bad Samaritan - Joseph LoDuca
 VSD-7579 Timeless - Robert Duncan
 VSD-7580 Sgt. Stubby: An American Hero - Patrick Doyle
 VSD-7582 Play It Again, Marvin! - Marvin Hamlisch / J. Ernest Green conductor (live concert)
 VSD-7584 Sicario: Day of the Soldado - Hildur Guðnadóttir
 VSD-7585 Shock and Awe - Jeff Beal

The New VSD Series (2018–present) 
The label was acquired by Concord Music in 2018 and abandoned the PolyGram/Universal numbering system. A new series was started as a result of Concord's UPC prefix. The rest of the UPC does not necessarily match the catalogue number of the release, and all have the VSD prefix regardless of which format it was released on. All LP versions released have not been included and should be in a separate section. This list concentrates on the CD portion and not digital releases.

VSD-00003 A Private War - H. Scott Salinas
VSD-00011 Emmet Otter's Jug-Band Christmas - Paul Williams
VSD-00013 Leaving on a Jet Plane - the Mitchell Trio & Denver, Boise, and Johnson
VSD-00020 The Zombies: The Complete Studio Recordings - the Zombies
VSD-00021 The Old Man & the Gun - Daniel Hart
VSD-00031 The Other Side of the Mountain Part 2 - Lee Holdridge
VSD-00036 The West Wing - W.G."Snuffy" Walden (This is a single disc release of the original limited edition two-disc version released in 2016 featuring score highlights from the set.)
VSD-00039 Krypton - Pinar Toprak
VSD-00072 Lonesome Dove - Basil Poledouris (reissue)
VSD-00082 House of Cards: Season 6 - Jeff Beal
VSD-00085 The Son - Nathan Barr (Official catalog number TBA soon)
VSD-00086 Hotel Mumbai - Volker Bertelmann (aka Hauschka)
VSD-00090 Cold Pursuit - George Fenton
VSD-00105 John Wick: Chapter 3 – Parabellum - Tyler Bates & Joel J. Richard
VSD-00110 The Goonies - Dave Grusin (Regular public release of popular score minus the bonus tracks contained in original 2010 Varèse Club 25th-anniversary release)
VSD-00124 Anne with an E - Amin Bhatia & Ari Posner
VSD-00133 The Peanut Butter Falcon - Jonathan Sadoff, Zach Dawes, Noam Pikelny & Gabe Witcher / various artists
VSD-00161 The Dark Crystal: Age of Resistance: Volume 1 - Daniel Pemberton
VSD-00164 The Dark Crystal: Age of Resistance: Volume 2 - Daniel Pemberton / Samuel Sim
VSD-00174 Midway (2019) - Harald Kloser & Thomas Wander
VSD-00220 Whiplash: The Deluxe Edition - Justin Hurwitz & Tim Simonec / various artists
VSD-00222 Hackers - Simon Boswell / various artists
VSD-00238 The Buddy Holly Story: The Deluxe Edition - various artists
VSD-00247 Army of Darkness - Joseph LoDuca, Danny Elfman ("March of the Dead" theme) (Reissue of 1993 album VSD-5411 as a limited edition of 1500 exclusively sold by the label)
VSD-00256 Star Wars: Shadows of the Empire - Joel McNeely / John Williams ("Star Wars" theme) (Reissue of 1996 album VSDE-5700 as a limited edition of 1500 copies exclusively sold by the label and does not contain the CD-ROM content of the original release that had a featurette on the recording of the music in Glasgow, Scotland)
VSD-00259 Dracula 2000 - Marco Beltrami (Reissue of album that originally premiered in The Little Box of Horrors box set in 2016 as an individual limited edition of 1500 exclusively sold by the label)
VSD-00336 The Trial of the Chicago 7 - Daniel Pemberton
VSD-00401  Scream: Original Motion Picture Soundtracks (Scream /Scream 2 /Scream 3 /Scream 4) - Marco Beltrami (This is a 6 CD box set features the complete and expanded soundtracks to the first four films of the horror franchise. Limited to Only 1800 Copies and sold exclusively through the Varese Sarabande website. This is also available on Vinyl as a 4 LP set)
VSD-00482  Scream (aka. Scream 5) - Brian Tyler (This score was also released digitally and on Vinyl. The CD is only Limited to 1800 Copies and sold exclusively through the Varese Sarabande website) 
VSD-00490 Firestarter - Tangerine Dream (Newly mastered version of original 1984 soundtrack by popular group. The CD is limited to 1500 Copies and sold exclusively through the Varese Sarabande website) 
VSD-00000  Rodgers and Hammerstein's The Sound of Music - Julie Andrews, Christopher Plummer & Various Artists

Varèse Sarabande CD Club (1989–1992) 
In the aftermath of Varèse Sarabande's new association with the MCA Distribution Corp., the long advertised CD Club finally debuted in March 1989 as mail order exclusives after a series of production problems. Those who mailed contact information to the label, as advertised in many Varèse Sarabande CD inlay cards, received a yearly flyer announcing the limited edition discs. This first incarnation of the club ran from 1989 to 1992 and clearly took advantage of the MCA partnership as several of the titles came directly from their vault. This was also helped Varèse Sarabande to reissue scores from older films as well as release soundtracks to theatrical releases that were not successful or a soundtrack was unavailable at that time for release. They were also able to release particular titles from their own LP catalog that were not available as regular mainstream releases at that point in time for logistical reasons. All releases were hand numbered and limited to runs of 1000, 1200, 1500 or 2500 and sold for $19.98 each. The assigned catalog numbers correspond to the month and year of release with the volume number following the decimal. All first-generation club titles were produced by Robert Townson and Tom Null.

In their mail order flyer, the original group of composers that were slated to appear in the original series of club releases included Jerry Goldsmith, Alex North, James Horner, Bill Conti, Georges Delerue, Miklos Rosza, Elmer Bernstein and Basil Poledouris amongst others. The label did release soundtracks by these composers and sometimes, more than one at time. However, Conti's and Delerue's titles, without any definitive explanation, were never released at that time and it is assumed that the Conti title may possibly have been The Karate Kid and the Delerue title may have been Joe Versus the Volcano. Both titles were eventually released as part of the reactivated version of the club after 2001.

For a long time, Cherry 2000 was the most sought after title along with the withdrawn Blood In Blood Out cancelled release in which at an auction that took place in late 1997, two overzealous bidders got into a heated bidding war for this title at an auction with the winner winning the CD for the amount of $2500 which is still the most that a CD has ever gone for. This title has been reissued several times since that auction and greatly expanded.

 VCL 8903.1 Cherry 2000 - Basil Poledouris (The first "official" CD Club release in 1989 after delays in manufacturing)
 VCL 8903.2 Fedora / Crisis ("Guitar Suite") - Miklós Rózsa
 VCL 8903.3 Symphonic Suites - Pino Donaggio (Compilation of suites from Piranha, Tourist Trap, The Howling and Home Movies which were previously released on LP)
 VCL 9001.4 Vibes - James Horner
 VCL 9001.5 The Rose Tattoo - Alex North
 VCL 9001.6 Red Sonja / Bloodline - Ennio Morricone
 VCL 9101.7 Raggedy Man - Jerry Goldsmith
 VCL 9101.8 Stars and Bars - Elmer Bernstein (Rejected score for 1988 Columbia Pictures film starring Daniel Day Lewis)
 VCL 9101.9 Eye of the Needle / Last Embrace - Miklós Rózsa
 VCL 9201.10 The 'Burbs - Jerry Goldsmith
 VCL 9201.11 The Film Music of Alfred Newman - Alfred Newman
 VCL 9201.12 We're No Angels - George Fenton

Two special budget releases appeared in 1992 for the final club year with the following two albums selling for the midline price of $10.98 apiece more as an experiment to see if titles from the club would sell at this price. These sold out instantly and were the last of this batch of the club ever to be featured at this price point. Later on Jagged Edge would be reissued as a part of the relaunched club under the Varèse Encore banner with new artwork and at the price of $15.98 which also sold out at the same 1000 copy run of its original release from 1992.

 BCL 6001 Jagged Edge - John Barry
 BCL 6002 Flesh+Blood - Basil Poledouris

Varèse Sarabande CD Club (2001–present) 
After an over nine-year hiatus, the Varèse Club officially returned after it was announced in 1998 by the label with no progress being made for almost three years until it was reactivated in November 2001, thanks to a change in re-use fee policies involving the American Federation of Musicians (AFM), more cooperative studio licensing and the internet boom of the late 1990s that helped with sales for all the record labels. The reactivation was in light of Film Score Monthly success in marketing limited edition scores from the archives of major studios that started with Twentieth Century Fox and Metro-Goldwyn-Mayer and expanding to Warner Bros., Turner Entertainment, Paramount Pictures and more recently, Universal Pictures that has finally opened their vaults. Other labels such as Intrada Records, Percepto Records, Citadel Records and Prometheus Records also began their own limited edition series starting in 1999, which put Varèse in a very strong position to make good on their 1998 announcement.

This time, the club would release titles at a quarterly interval with as many as four releases per batch and as low as one (i.e. Spartacus: Deluxe Edition, The List of Adrian Messenger). Their record for an announced batch is six titles which happened in December 2013. Unlike the original series, this version of the club also featured more box sets (i.e. Jerry Goldsmith at Fox, Bernard Herrmann at Fox, The Karate Kid, North and South, etc.), deluxe editions of previously released catalog titles greatly expanded from their commercial releases, live concert recordings that were featured in a CD/DVD hybrid (i.e. Alien: A Biomechanical Symphony, Fimucité Closing Night Gala) and a celebration set dedicated to the films of 1985 called At the Movies 1985 which came in a gatefold LP styled packaging featuring six CDs in LP reproduction slipcases. A new numbering system was devised consisting of the month then year followed by the limited edition number of copies. The label has since reduced their output of club releases that had started with four then lowering it two or three titles at a time and three batches per year instead of four which they had done as recently as 2013.

This series also featured a popular staple to the club called the Encore Series, which were reissues of out-of-print catalog titles from the label's very beginning. This part of the club gave fans the opportunity to acquire these long out-of-print titles which also included some original Varèse Sarabande Club titles from the original series at the price of $15.98 with the run limited to 1000 copies only. Amongst the titles that were reissued they included Jagged Edge, Vibes, Eye of the Needle, The Boy Who Could Fly and the very last produced encore title, Raggedy Man by Jerry Goldsmith which was amongst the final releases by producer Robert Townson for the label.

 VCL 1101-1001 Heartbeeps - John Williams
 VCL 1101-1002 Project X - James Horner
 VCL 1101-1003  - Elmer Bernstein
 VCL 0202-1004 Die Hard - Michael Kamen
 VCL 0202-1005 The Long, Hot Summer / Sanctuary - Alex North
 VCL 0202-1006 Love Is a Many-Splendored Thing - Alfred Newman
 VCL 0502-1007 The Ballad of Cable Hogue - Jerry Goldsmith
 VCL 0502-1008 Cast a Giant Shadow - Elmer Bernstein
 VCL 0502-1009 The Virgin Queen - Franz Waxman
 VCL 0702-1010 The Sand Pebbles: The Deluxe Edition - Jerry Goldsmith
 VCL 0702-1011 The Fury: The Deluxe Edition - John Williams
 VCL 0702-1012 Romancing the Stone - Alan Silvestri
 VCL 0702-1013 The Bride - Maurice Jarre
 VCL 1102-1014 Home Alone 2: Lost in New York: The Deluxe Edition - John Williams
 VCL 1102-1015 Big - Howard Shore
 VCL 1102-1016 Studs Lonigan - Jerry Goldsmith
 VCL 0403-1017 Hawaii: The Deluxe Edition - Elmer Bernstein
 VCL 0403-1018 Magic - Jerry Goldsmith
 VCL 0403-1019 Beloved Infidel - Franz Waxman
 VCL 0403-1020 The Return of a Man Called Horse: The Deluxe Edition - Laurence Rosenthal
 VCL 0703-1021 Varèse Sarabande 25th Anniversary Collection: Volume Two - various artists (This four-disc set was the follow up to the regular commercial release commemorating the label's 25th anniversary featuring more music from their vast soundtrack library and was only sold through the website as an unnumbered limited edition that only lasted until the end of 2003. It would be brought back years later for the 30th anniversary also an unnumbered limited edition for a short time in 2008 again lasting until the end of that year)
 VCL 0803-1022 Predator - Alan Silvestri
 VCL 0803-1023 Justine: The Deluxe Edition - Jerry Goldsmith
 VCL 0803-1024 The Story of Ruth - Franz Waxman
 VCL 1103-1025 The Robe: The Deluxe Edition - Alfred Newman
 VCL 1103-1026 Commando - James Horner
 VCL 1103-1027 The Island - Ennio Morricone
 VCL 0204-1028 Jerry Goldsmith at 20th Century Fox - Jerry Goldsmith (Limited edition six-disc box set commemorating Goldsmith's period at the famed movie studio featuring previously released music and unreleased music)
 VCL 0804-1029 The Great Escape: The Deluxe Edition - Elmer Bernstein
 VCL 0804-1030 Fitzwilly / The Long Goodbye - John Williams (Featured the Dave Grusin Trio performing Williams' themes for the score along with Jack Sheldon and others)
 VCL 0804-1031 Piranha - Pino Donaggio
 VCL 1104-1032 The Agony and the Ecstasy: The Deluxe Edition - Alex North / The Artist Who Did Not Want to Paint - Jerry Goldsmith
 VCL 1104-1033 Three Coins in the Fountain - Victor Young
 VCL 1104-1034 Sheena - Richard Hartley
 VCL 0505-1035 Alien Nation (rejected score) - Jerry Goldsmith
 VCL 0505-1036 Désirée - Alex North
 VCL 0505-1037 Making the Grade - Basil Poledouris / various artists
 VCL 0805-1038 Spacehunter: Adventures in the Forbidden Zone - Elmer Bernstein
 VCL 0805-1039 F.I.S.T. / Slow Dancing in the Big City - Bill Conti
 VCL 0805-1040 True Confessions - Georges Delerue
 VCL 0805-1041 The Kindred - David Newman
 VCL 1105-1042 Broadcast News - Bill Conti / Michael Gore, Michel Camilo* (*additional music)
 VCL 1105-1043 The Scalphunters - Elmer Bernstein
 VCL 1105-1044 The Left Hand of God - Victor Young
 VCL 1105-1045 Top Secret! - Maurice Jarre
 VCL 0306-1046 Ghostbusters - Elmer Bernstein
 VCL 0306-1047 Rookie of the Year / A Night in the Life of Jimmy Reardon / Bushwhacked - Bill Conti
 VCL 0306-1048 Return to Peyton Place - Franz Waxman
 VCL 0306-1049 An Almost Perfect Affair - Georges Delerue
 VCL 0706-1050 Gloria - Bill Conti
 VCL 0706-1051 The War of the Roses / The Sandlot - David Newman
 VCL 0706-1052 An Unfinished Life (rejected score) / 14 Unfinished Lives for Solo Piano - Christopher Young (Unused score composed by Young for the 2005 film of the same name. Also features a piano suite of themes used and unused for the film in fourteen movements performed on solo piano)
 VCL 0706-1053 Sky Bandits - Alfi Kabiljo
 VCL 1106-1054 Birdman of Alcatraz - Elmer Bernstein
 VCL 1106-1055 Runaway: The Deluxe Edition - Jerry Goldsmith
 VCL 1106-1056 Lucas - Dave Grusin
 VCL 1106-1057 Seven Cities of Gold / The Rains of Ranchipur - Hugo Friedhofer
 VCL 1106-1058 Careful, He Might Hear You - Ray Cook
 VCL 0307-1059 The Karate Kid Box (The Karate Kid / The Karate Kid Part II / The Karate Kid Part III / The Next Karate Kid) - Bill Conti (Premiere release of all four score from the Karate Kid films in an elaborate box which would be reissued as individual titles by the label with the exception of The Next Karate Kid. The first three scores have also been reissued and remastered by La-La Land Records)
 VCL 0307-1060 The Vanishing - Jerry Goldsmith
 VCL 0307-1061 Author! Author! - Dave Grusin / Author! Author! (rejected score) - Johnny Mandel (CD features both the replacement score by Grusin used in the 1982 film as well as the unused score by Mandel for the film that was based on The Four Seasons)
 VCL 0307-1062 84 Charing Cross Road - George Fenton
 VCL 0707-1063 The 'Burbs: The Deluxe Edition - Jerry Goldsmith
 VCL 0707-1064 F/X: The Deluxe Edition - Bill Conti
 VCL 0707-1065 Les Misérables - Alex North
 VCL 0707-1066 Anne of the Indies / Man on a Tightrope - Franz Waxman
 VCL 1107-1067 North by Northwest - Bernard Herrmann / Joel McNeely conducts (re-recording)
 VCL 1107-1068 Neighbors - Bill Conti / Neighbors (1981) (rejected score) - Tom Scott (CD features both the replacement score by Conti used in the 1981 film as well as the rejected score by jazz saxophonist Tom Scott which was in a suspenseful mode)
 VCL 1107-1069 By Love Possessed - Elmer Bernstein
 VCL 1107-1070 The Tall Men - Victor Young
 VCL 1107-1071 Magic Fire - Richard Wagner / Erich Wolfgang Korngold, arranger and conductor
 VCL 0208-1072 North and South - Bill Conti (Elaborate four-disc set containing almost five hours of music of the ten composed for landmark 1985 ABC mini-series which comes housed in a blue colored slipcase)
 VCL 0208-1073 The Caretakers / The Young Doctors - Elmer Bernstein
 VCL 0208-1074 Viva Zapata! / The 13th Letter - Alex North
 VCL 0208-1075 Matilda - David Newman
 VCL 0608-1076 Gangs of New York / The Journey of Natty Gann / The Scarlet Letter (rejected scores box set) - Elmer Bernstein (Elaborate four-disc box set containing rejected scores composed by Bernstein for these films making their debut)
 VCL 0608-1077 Iron Eagle - Basil Poledouris
 VCL 0608-1078 My Cousin Rachel - Franz Waxman
 VCL 0608-1079 The Man Who Loved Women - Henry Mancini
 VCL 0608-1080 In a Shallow Grave - Jonathan Sheffer
 VCL 0908-1081 The Matrix: The Deluxe Edition - Don Davis
 VCL 0908-1082 North and South: Book II - Bill Conti (Elaborate four-disc set containing almost four hours of music for the 1994 sequel to the landmark 1985 ABC mini-series which is housed in a red colored slipcase)
 VCL 0908-1083 Anna Lucasta - Elmer Bernstein
 VCL 0908-1084 Pony Soldier - Alex North
 VCL 0908-1085 Vamp - Jonathan Elias
 VCL 1108-1086 Short Circuit - David Shire
 VCL 1108-1087 Report to the Commissioner - Elmer Bernstein
 VCL 1108-1088 The President's Lady - Alfred Newman
 VCL 1108-1089 Silver Bullet - Jay Chattaway
 VCL 0309-1090 Hanover Street - John Barry
 VCL 0309-1091 Nightwing - Henry Mancini
 VCL 0309-1092 Lure of the Wilderness - Franz Waxman
 VCL 0309-1093 Russkies - James Newton Howard
 VCL 0609-1094 Lonely Are the Brave - Jerry Goldsmith
 VCL 0609-1095 The Right Stuff - Bill Conti
 VCL 0609-1096 Norma Rae - David Shire
 VCL 0609-1097 Hard Contract - Alex North
 VCL 0909-1098 Escape from the Planet of the Apes - Jerry Goldsmith
 VCL 0909-1099 Crime in the Streets - Franz Waxman
 VCL 0909-1100 A Walk in the Spring Rain - Elmer Bernstein
 VCL 0909-1101 Children of the Corn - Jonathan Elias
 VCL 1209-1102 Freud: The Deluxe Edition - Jerry Goldsmith
 VCL 1209-1103 Bird of Paradise - Daniele Amfitheatrof / Lydia Bailey - Hugo Friedhofer
 VCL 0310-1104 The Goonies - Dave Grusin
 VCL 0310-1105 The Spiral Road - Jerry Goldsmith
 VCL 0310-1106 The Scout / Dreamer - Bill Conti
 VCL 0310-1107 The Manhattan Project - Philippe Sarde
 VCL 0410-1108 Star Trek: The Deluxe Edition - Michael Giacchino (Expanded two-disc release of the popular 2009 edition in an oversized digibook with booklet)
 VCL 0610-1109 Spartacus - Alex North (Elaborate six-disc set and a DVD of interviews with composers such as John Williams, Christopher Young and others as well as a detailed booklet and comes housed in a slipcase hard box with original artwork which was a limited edition of 5000 copies to commemorate the film's 50th anniversary)
 VCL 0910-1110 A Gathering of Eagles - Jerry Goldsmith
 VCL 0910-1111 The Snake Pit - Alfred Newman / The Three Faces of Eve - Robert E. Dolan
 VCL 0910-1112 The Formula - Bill Conti
 VCL 0910-1113 Fimucité 2: Closing Night Gala 2008 (DVD & CD) - Diego Navarro and Joel McNeely, conductors
 VCL 0910-1114 Nightflyers - Doug Timm (Release dedicated to the late composer)
 VCL 1110-1115 Family Plot - John Williams
 VCL 1110-1116 Taps - Maurice Jarre
 VCL 1110-1117 The Karate Kid - Bill Conti
 VCL 1110-1118 Home Movies - Pino Donaggio
 VCL 0511-1119 The Alfred Hitchcock Hour: Volume One - Bernard Herrmann
 VCL 0511-1120 Scream: The Deluxe Edition - Marco Beltrami
 VCL 0511-1121 My Demon Lover - David Newman / Ed Alton (additional music)
 VCL 0511-1122 Fimucité 3: Jerry Goldsmith 80th Birthday Tribute Concert (DVD & CD) - Mark Snow & Diego Navarro, conductors
 VCL 0711-1123 The Egyptian: The Deluxe Edition - Alfred Newman & Bernard Herrmann
 VCL 1011-1124 Midway - John Williams
 VCL 1011-1125 The Alfred Hitchcock Hour: Volume Two - Bernard Herrmann
 VCL 1011-1126 Mimic: The Deluxe Edition - Marco Beltrami
 VCL 1011-1127 The Karate Kid Part II - Bill Conti
 VCL 1211-1128 Bernard Herrmann at 20th Century Fox - Bernard Herrmann (Elaborate fourteen-disc box set featuring all of Herrmann's work at the famed studio in complete form)
 VCL 0512-1129 Chinatown - Jerry Goldsmith (Reissue of 1995 Varèse Sarabande release)
 VCL 0512-1130 The Alfred Hitchcock Hour: Volume Three - Lyn Murray, Leonard Rosenman, Lalo Schifrin and Benny Carter
 VCL 0512-1131 The Karate Kid Part III - Bill Conti
 VCL 0512-1132 Eye of the Needle (Varèse Encore) - Miklós Rózsa
 VCL 0512-1133 Amazing Grace and Chuck (Varèse Encore) - Elmer Bernstein
 VCL 0512-1134 The Clan of the Cave Bear (Varèse Encore) - Alan Silvestri
 VCL 0512-1135 Alien: A Biomechanical Symphony - Fimucité 3 (DVD & CD) - Diego Navarro, conductor
 VCL 0712-1136 Crimes of the Heart (Varèse Encore) - Georges Delerue
 VCL 0712-1137 Tai-Pan (Varèse Encore) - Maurice Jarre
 VCL 1012-1138 Die Hard 2: Die Harder: The Deluxe Edition - Michael Kamen
 VCL 1012-1139 The Red Pony - Jerry Goldsmith
 VCL 1012-1140 Enemy Mine: The Deluxe Edition - Maurice Jarre
 VCL 1012-1141 The Boy Who Could Fly (Varèse Encore) - Bruce Broughton
 VCL 1012-1142 Man on Fire (Varèse Encore) - John Scott
 VCL 1213-1143 Star Trek: Nemesis: The Deluxe Edition - Jerry Goldsmith
 VCL 1213-1144 The Abyss: The Deluxe Edition - Alan Silvestri
 VCL 1213-1145 Brass Target - Laurence Rosenthal
 VCL 1213-1146 Suspect (Varèse Encore) - Michael Kamen
 VCL 1213-1147 Vibes (Varèse Encore) - James Horner
 VCL 1213-1148 Runaway (Varèse Encore) - Jerry Goldsmith (Reissue of Varèse Club deluxe edition featuring same contents as the 2006 release)
 VCL 0214-1149 The List of Adrian Messenger - Jerry Goldsmith
 VCL 0714-1150 Star Trek Into Darkness: The Deluxe Edition - Michael Giacchino
 VCL 1114-1151 Predator 2: The Deluxe Edition - Alan Silvestri
 VCL 1114-1152 Peggy Sue Got Married: The Deluxe Edition - John Barry
 VCL 1114-1153 For Whom the Bell Tolls - Victor Young (Reissue of original Stanyan Records release)
 VCL 1114-1154 Fedora (Varèse Encore) - Miklós Rózsa (Does not contain The Crisis Guitar Suite from the original Varèse Club release from 1989)
 VCL 0615-1155 Back in Time ... 1985 at the Movies - David Newman conductor / various artists (Elaborate six-CD set housed in an oversized LP jacket with discs housed in individual cardboard slipcases. Includes The Goonies by Dave Grusin / 1985 at Varèse Sarabande / The Songs / The Back to the Future Trilogy (re-recording) - John Debney, conductor / Out of Africa (re-recording) - Joel McNeely, conductor)
 VCL 0615-1156 Gremlins 2: The New Batch: 25th Anniversary Edition - Jerry Goldsmith
 VCL 0615-1157 Outbreak: The Deluxe Edition - James Newton Howard
 VCL 0715-1158 Fimucité 6: Universal Pictures 100th Anniversary Gala - Diego Navarro, conductor
 VCL 1015-1159 Back to the Future Part III: 25th Anniversary Edition - Alan Silvestri
 VCL 1015-1160 Chain Reaction: The Deluxe Edition - Jerry Goldsmith
 VCL 1015-1161 Where the River Runs Black (Varèse Encore) - James Horner
 VCL 1215-1162 North and South: Highlights - Bill Conti (Single disc highlights of music from original four-disc club release)
 VCL 1215-1163 Spies Like Us (Varèse Encore) - Elmer Bernstein
 VCL 0216-1164 Executive Decision: The Deluxe Edition - Jerry Goldsmith
 VCL 0216-1165 Cocoon: The Return: The Deluxe Edition - James Horner
 VCL 0216-1166 Bloodline - Ennio Morricone / Craig Hundley (additional music, as Craig Huxley)
 VCL 0216-1167 The Whales of August (Varèse Encore) - Alan Price
 VCL 0516-1168 Starship Troopers: The Deluxe Edition - Basil Poledouris
 VCL 0516-1169 Volcano: The Deluxe Edition - Alan Silvestri
 VCL 0516-1170 Spartacus: The Complete Album Masters - Alex North (Single disc edition of score in stereo sound that was featured in six-disc Spartacus: 50th Anniversary release. It came with a cardboard slipcase housing the standard jewel case)
 VCL 0516-1171 Zelly and Me (Varèse Encore) - Pino Donaggio
 VCL 0916-1172 Hellboy: The Deluxe Edition - Marco Beltrami
 VCL 0916-1173 RoboCop 3: The Deluxe Edition - Basil Poledouris
 VCL 0916-1174 Jagged Edge (Varèse Encore) - John Barry
 VCL 1016-1175 The Omen: 40th Anniversary Edition - Jerry Goldsmith
 VCL 1016-1176 Scream 2: The Deluxe Edition - Marco Beltrami
 VCL 1216-1177 Star Trek Beyond: The Deluxe Edition - Michael Giacchino
 VCL 0317-1178 Stanley & Iris: The Deluxe Edition / Pete 'n' Tillie - John Williams
 VCL 0317-1179 Under Siege 2: Dark Territory: The Deluxe Edition - Basil Poledouris
 VCL 0317-1180 The Black Cauldron (Varèse Encore) - Elmer Bernstein
 VCL 0618-1184 The Cowboys: The Deluxe Edition - John Williams
 VCL 0618-1185 Small Soldiers: The Deluxe Edition - Jerry Goldsmith
 VCL 0618-1186 Georges Delerue: The Complete London Sessions - Georges Delerue (Condensed two-disc reissue of original three-volume releases from 1990 to 1992 recorded in London that eliminated original soundtrack recordings featured in those volumes)
 VCL 0618-1187 Heathers (Varèse Encore) - David Newman
 VCL 1018-1188 Dracula: The Deluxe Edition - John Williams
 VCL 1018-1189 On Deadly Ground: The Deluxe Edition - Basil Poledouris
 VCL 1018-1190 A Show of Force (Varèse Encore) - Georges Delerue
 VCL 0219 1191 RoboCop 2: The Deluxe Edition - Leonard Rosenman
 VCL 0219-1192 Dreamcatcher: The Deluxe Edition - James Newton Howard (Individual two-disc reissue of score contained in the Stephen King Collection limited edition set contents are identical with no additional music added to this release)
 VCL 0219-1193 Raggedy Man (Varèse Encore) - Jerry Goldsmith (The last official club release by producer Robert Townson)
 VCL 0919-1194 Star Trek: The Deluxe Edition - Michael Giacchino (Reissue of 2010 digipak two-disc set, no additional music included)
 VCL 0919-1195 Air Force One: The Deluxe Edition - Jerry Goldsmith / Joel McNeely
 VCL 0919-1196 Rooster Cogburn: The Deluxe Edition - Laurence Rosenthal
 VCL 1115-1197 The Stand: The Deluxe Edition - W. G. Snuffy Walden (Individual two-disc reissue of score contained in the Stephen King Collection limited edition set contents are identical with no additional music added to this release)
 VCL 1115-1198 U.S. Marshals: The Deluxe Edition - Jerry Goldsmith
 VCL 1115-1199 Dolores Claiborne: The Deluxe Edition - Danny Elfman
 VCL 0520 1201 The Running Man: The Deluxe Edition - Harold Faltermeyer
 VCL 0520-1202 SeaQuest DSV: The Deluxe Edition - John Debney
 VCL 0820-1204 Wild Wild West: The Deluxe Edition - Elmer Bernstein
 VCL 1020-1205 How to Train Your Dragon: The Deluxe Edition - John Powell
 VCL 1020-1206 Village of the Damned: The Deluxe Edition - John Carpenter & Dave Davies
 VCL 1120-1207 Looney Tunes: Back in Action: The Deluxe Edition - Jerry Goldsmith / John Debney & Cameron Patrick (additional music) (Notable for being the very final Jerry Goldsmith recorded and released by the label due to illness. He would die in August 2004. Also, due to his illness, Debney was brought in to finish the film when Goldsmith could not and his contributions are now available)
 VCL 1120-1208 Babe: The Deluxe Edition - Nigel Westlake (Debut of complete score without dialog or songs originally featured on the original 1995 Varèse release)
 VCL 0321-1209 Along Came a Spider: The Deluxe Edition - Jerry Goldsmith
 VCL 0321-1210 The Serpent and the Rainbow: The Deluxe Edition - Brad Fiedel / Babatunde Olatunji (The complete definitive release of this once rare soundtrack in the label's history featuring the partially used score by Olatunji which was never released until now with the rest going unused)
 VCL 0521-1211 Lionheart: The Deluxe Edition - Jerry Goldsmith (Complete edition of soundtrack from the 1987 film which adds two more tracks that have never been released. Was delayed because errors in the artwork caused the label to reprint all artwork for June/July 2021 official release)
 VCL 0521-1212 Knowing: The Deluxe Edition - Marco Beltrami
 VCL 0621-1213 Paycheck: The Delxue Edition - John Powell
 VCL 0621-1214 The Matrix: The Complete Edition - Don Davis (The definitive edition of 1999 score featuring the missing music from the 2008 Varese Deluxe Edition on two discs to coincide with the vinyl release of soundtrack for Record Store Day)
 VCL 0621-1214 The Matrix: The Complete Edition (SCAD Edition) - Don Davis (The definitive edition of 1999 score featuring the missing music from the 2008 Varese Deluxe Edition on two discs to coincide with the vinyl release of soundtrack for Record Store Day. This second version of the soundtrack is a Super Audio CD which can only be played in SACD players to hear the score's full audio capbilities in 5.1 surround sound. This CD also plays in standard CD players as well as computer drives and Blu Ray players and is priced at $39.98)
 VCL 0821-1216 Love Field: The Deluxe Edition - Jerry Goldsmith/Bill Payne (Jazz Source tracks)
 VCL 0821-1217 Dante's Peak: The Delxue Edition - John Frizzell/James Newton Howard (Despite the billing, Howard wrote or co-wrote with Frizell many of the tracks)
 VCL 1021-1218 The Crow: The Deluxe Edition - Graeme Revell (Features Revell’s end title song, “It Can’t Rain All the Time,” performed by Jane Siberry)
 VCL 1221-1219 Elf: The Deluxe Edition - John Debney
 VCL 1221-1220 Blue Velvet: The Deluxe Edition - Angelo Badalamenti/Various (Definitive edition of original score and soundtrack extended program of previously unreleased  film cues, alternates and outtakes entitled “Lumberton Firewood.”)
 VCL 0322-1221 Iron Giant: The Deluxe Edition - Michael Kamen
 VCL 0322-1222 How To Train Your Dragon 2: The Deluxe Edition - John Powell
 VCL 0522-1223 Presumed Innocent: The Deluxe Edition - John Williams
 VCL 0522-1224 The Bourne Identity: The Tumscent Edition - John Powell
 VSD-00198 The Big Fix - Bill Conti (This was assigned a non-sequential number not following in line with the other current club releases. It is also possible that this title was meant to be VCL-1203 but probably erroroniously given VSD-00198 which would normally be a regular release from the label)

The Limited Edition Series (2009–2018) 
The Limited Edition Series was created in 2009 as an offshoot of the Varèse Sarabande CD Club with one major difference. The Limited Edition Series concentrates more on soundtrack titles for films that either have gone direct to digital, DVD or Blu-ray as well as some theatrical titles that received a very brief run, mini-series and television series such as Lost or Hemlock Grove. The majority of titles under this banner are limited to 1000 copies and look like the standard regular Varèse Sarabande mainstream releases with a small brown part containing the label's logo and white with their familiar lettering. Lost: The Last Episodes has the distinction of being the only title of more than 1000 copies produced with 5000 in this series. The label on occasion offered signed autographed booklets of these releases when available.

The first releases in its debut were The Stoning of Soraya M. by John Debney and In the Electric Mist by Marco Beltrami in June 2009 and up to this point, Jim Henson's The StoryTeller by Rachel Portman is the final release under this banner at the moment.

 VLE-3201 Film Music Festival Kraków 2015 - various artists
 VLE-3202 Film Music Festival Kraków 2016 - various artists
 VLE-3209 Film Music Festival Kraków 2017 - various artists
 VLE-4201 The Stoning of Soraya M. - John Debney
 VLE-4202 In the Electric Mist - Marco Beltrami
 VLE-4203 Jesse Stone: Stone Cold - Jeff Beal (Features musical selections from four Jesse Stone films based on the novels by Robert B. Parker starring Tom Selleck that were released. Later released in comprehensive two-CD standard release featuring more music from the series of films)
 VLE-4204 The Killing Room - Brian Tyler
 VLE-4205 Oscar: The Color of Destiny / Mira La Luna ("Look at the Moon") - Diego Navarro
 VLE-4206 Passchendaele - Jan A. P. Kaczmarek
 VLE-4207 Lost: The Final Episodes - Michael Giacchino (This two-CD set contains the complete scores to the shows' final two episodes that were truncated in the Lost Season Six standard release that featured highlights from the final season)
 VLE-4208 The Special Relationship - Alexandre Desplat
 VLE-4209 Devil - Fernando Velázquez
 VLE-4210 Hostel: Part III - Frederik Wiedmann
 VLE-4211 Columbus Circle - Brian Tyler
 VLE-4212 The Mighty Macs - William Ross
 VLE-4213 A Thousand Words - John Debney
 VLE-4214 Mimesis: Night of the Living Dead - Diego Navarro
 VLE-4215 Riddle - Scott Glasgow
 VLE-4216 The Adventurer: The Curse of the Midas Box - Fernando Velázquez
 VLE-4217 Haunt - Reinhold Heil
 VLE-4218 Wicked Blood - Elia Cmíral
 VLE-4219 No God, No Master - Nuno Malo
 VLE-4220 Third Person - Dario Marianelli
 VLE-4221 Dragonheart 3: The Sorcerer's Curse - Mark McKenzie / Randy Edelman* (*Themes From the original 1996 film Dragonheart)
 VLE-4222 Hemlock Grove: Season 2 - Nathan Barr
 VLE-4223 Jupiter Ascending - Michael Giacchino (Also released by Sony Classical in Europe. The releases are identical in content)
 VLE-4224 The SpongeBob Movie: Sponge Out of Water - John Debney
 VLE-4225 Chappie - Hans Zimmer / Steve Mazzaro / Andrew Kawczynski
 VLE-4226 The Lovers - Dirk Brossé
 VLE-4227 The Dovekeepers - Jeff Beal
 VLE-4228 Seventh Son - Marco Beltrami
 VLE-4229 Rise of the Legend - Shigeru Umebayashi
 VLE-4230 Devil's Knot - Mychael Danna
 VLE-4231 Gamba - Benjamin Wallfisch
 VLE-4232 Open Season: Scared Silly - Dominic Lewis & Rupert Gregson-Williams
 VLE-4233 Of Mind and Music - Carlos José Alvarez
 VLE-4234 USS Indianapolis: Men of Courage - Laurent Eyquem
 VLE-4235 Bitter Harvest - Benjamin Wallfisch
 VLE-4236 The Exception - Ilan Eshkeri
 VLE-4237 Passage to Dawn - Diego Navarro
 VLE-4238 Mully - Benjamin Wallfisch
 VLE-4239 The Rendezvous - Austin Wintory
 VLE-4240 The Long Road Home - Jeff Beal
 VLE-9201 Xena: Warrior Princess: 20th Anniversary Anthology - Joseph LoDuca (Housed in a leather styled digibook with the Xena television series logo in gold embossed lettering and also came with a picture banner celebrating the show's anniversary. The first orders came with personally inscribed banners. The CDs feature the same contents as the individual releases previously released by the label)
 VLE-9203 A Nightmare on Elm Street 8 CD Collection - Charles Bernstein (A Nightmare on Elm Street) / Christopher Young (A Nightmare on Elm Street 2: Freddy's Revenge) / Angelo Badalamenti / Ken Harrison (A Nightmare on Elm Street 3: Dream Warriors) / Craig Safan (A Nightmare on Elm Street 4: The Dream Master) / Jay Ferguson (A Nightmare on Elm Street 5: The Dream Child) / Brian May (Freddy's Dead: The Final Nightmare) / J. Peter Robinson (Wes Craven's New Nightmare / Graeme Revell (Freddy vs. Jason) (This set came with a replica Freddy Kruger sweater that covered the box. Features music from all of the films some greatly expanded and others reissues of their original album releases)
 VLE-9206 The Little Box of Horrors - Charles Bernstein (Deadly Friend, A Nightmare on Elm Street) / Howard Shore (The Fly / Michael Convertino (The Hidden) / Jay Chattaway (Maniac) / Jerry Goldsmith (The Mephisto Waltz / The Other) / Marco Beltrami (Dracula 2000, Mimic: Deluxe Edition, Scream: Deluxe Edition / Richard Stone (Pumpkinhead) / Brad Fiedel (The Serpent and the Rainbow) / Bob Cobert (The Strange Case of Dr. Jekyll and Mr. Hyde) (This collection which came housed in a black LP styled carrying case not unlike the LP to CD Series with silver embossed lettering stating The Little Box of Horrors along with the Varèse logo next to it. Each CD, like the LP to CD Series, came in an LP replica styled slipcase and a booklet with liner notes. A few of the titles are reissues of the label's out-of-print titles such as The Serpent and the Rainbow & Scream and a few making their debut such as Dracula 2000 and Pumpkinhead)
 VLE-9210 Stephen King Collection - James Newton Howard (Dreamcatcher: The Deluxe Edition) / Tangerine Dream (Firestarter) (reissue) / W. G. Snuffy Walden (The Stand: The Deluxe Edition) / Nicholas Pike (The Shining) (This eight-disc limited edition set dedicated to the famous author features scores from four of his book-to-film adaptations. This set came housed in a book sized digipak that resembles a paperback and came with a booklet with liner notes)
 VLE-9218 Murder by Death / The Pursuit of Happiness - Dave Grusin
 VLE-9220 ...And Justice for All - Dave Grusin
 VLE-9221 Absence of Malice - Dave Grusin
 VLE-9222 Firewalker - Gary Chang
 VLE-9225 Jim Henson's The StoryTeller - Rachel Portman (Released in a digipak complete with a booklet with liner notes)

LP to CD Series (2015–2016) 
The LP to CD Subscription Series is another part of the label that was created and began in June 2015, which released titles from their past LP catalog that could be transferred from vinyl records to CDs for a fee of $10.00 per title per month plus $4.50 for shipping costs (automatically billed to a credit card) for 12 months finally ending in May 2016. This originally caused problems because many collectors did not want all of the titles that were being offered. The label then relented in the middle of the run and then offered the titles for sale individually for the same amount as the regular subscription. This started with Enola Gay by Maurice Jarre. Many chose to complete the run of twelve titles, not wanting to miss out on the titles being offered randomly and others chose to stop at some point.

Each title was strictly limited for that particular month of release and would go out of print after that month passed. The label did not go back and reissue any the past titles that fans had missed. All the titles were announced randomly and not in the order of the number assigned to them. Each title was housed in reproduction LP style jacket cardboard slipcases with all original artwork and lettering from their LP counterpart intact along with a disclaimer stating if the title came from a vinyl source in small print in which most cases were LP transfers because of missing master tapes in the Varèse Sarabande vaults. A few titles did come from master tapes that were available including Invitation au voyage.

The first title issued was April Fool's Day by Charles Bernstein (VLE-9200-02, June 2015) which came housed in a mini LP-style maroon carrying case with the Varèse Sarabande logo embossed in gold foil lettering and room to store all subsequent future LP to CD titles in the series. Magnificent Obsession was the final release of the subscription set released in May 2016. Fans wanted the series to go on, but the label did not want to continue it and there are no plans to bring it back.

The list reflects the assigned catalog number for each title and not the order in which the titles were released during the subscription.

 VLE 9200-01 A Minor Miracle - Rick Patterson
 VLE 9200-02 April Fool's Day - Charles Bernstein (First official subscription release of the series that came with the LP to CD carrying case in maroon with a gold embossed version of the label's logo from the 1980s on the front issued by the label to store all future CD releases of the series)
 VLE 9200-03 The Whistle Blower - John Scott
 VLE 9200-04 Sister, Sister - Richard Einhorn
 VLE 9200-05 Let's Get Harry - Brad Fiedel
 VLE 9200-06 Bad Dreams - Jay Ferguson (This title was originally announced as part of the 704 series of releases in 1988 makes its official release debut here after years of speculation of its official existence on CD in which the label finally confirmed that the title was cancelled and never released at all in 1988 except for LP and cassette. The source of this release is on original LP master which was the only source available for release)
 VLE 9200-07 Invitation au voyage - Gabriel Yared (Expanded from its original LP releases on Varèse Sarabande and Milan Records in Europe)
 VLE 9200-08 Enola Gay - Maurice Jarre
 VLE 9200-09 Blind Date - Stanley Myers / John Kongos (songs)
 VLE 9200-10 52 Pick-Up - Gary Chang
 VLE 9200-11 Mountbatten: The Last Viceroy - John Scott
 VLE 9200-12 Magnificent Obsession - Frank Skinner

This version of the list reflects the release month for each title that was sent randomly by the label and not the catalog number in which the titles were assigned for the subscription.

 June 2015 April Fool's Day - Charles Bernstein
 July 2015 Invitation au voyage - Gabriel Yared
 August 2015 Let's Get Harry - Brad Fiedel
 September 2015 Blind Date (1984) - Stanley Myers / John Kongos (songs)
 October 2015 Enola Gay - Maurice Jarre
 November 2015 Sister, Sister - Richard Einhorn
 December 2015 The Whistle Blower - John Scott
 January 2016 Mountbatten: The Last Viceroy - John Scott
 February 2016 Bad Dreams - Jay Ferguson
 March 2016 A Minor Miracle - Rick Patterson
 April 2016 52 Pick-Up - Gary Chang
 May 2016 Magnificent Obsession - Frank Skinner

We Hear You Series (2016 - 2018) 
This was a short lived series that started in late 2016 which the label created as the label attempted to listen to soundtrack fans and hear which titles from their catalog or another label's catalog they would like to see released. The label mined companies such as Paramount, MGM and Universal for titles. The series did premiere the score from two popular television series, "The West Wing" and "21 Jump Street" which was in demand by many fans while, it also premiered the debut of the original scores to the classic Neil Simon films "Barefoot In The Park" and "The Odd Couple".

The series ended in early 2018 after Concord officially took over the label and revamped the Varese catalog. The first official release was Lalo Schifrin's score for "Boulevard Nights" which was released on Warner Bros. Records in 1978 and featuring a song from Grammy Winning jazz guitarist George Benson.

 VLE-9204 Revenge of the Ninja: Enhanced Edition - Robert J. Walsh (Reisssue and reimagining of the original soundtrack by the composer from the original 1983 Varese Sarabande LP release)
 VLE 9207 Barefoot in the Park / The Odd Couple - Neal Hefti
 VLE-9208 Boulevard Nights - Lalo Schifrin / George Benson (songs) (Reissue of 1978 Warner Bros. LP)
 VLE-9209 Down Twisted - Eric Allaman & Reinhard Scheuregger (as Berlin Game) (Reissue of 1987 LP release from the label from the STV series)
 VLE-9211 The West Wing - W.G. "Snuffy" Walden (Two disc set featuring music from the series' ten seasons later reissued as a single disc edition in 2019 as VSD-00036)
 VLE-9212 Heaven Can Wait / Racing with the Moon - Dave Grusin (Reissue of 2013 Kritzerland Records release)
 VLE-9213 9/30/55 - Leonard Rosenman
 VLE-9214 21 Jump Street - Peter Bernstein
 VLE-9215 The Yakuza - Dave Grusin (Remastered and expanded release from the original 2005 Film Score Monthly release)

Masters Film Music (1986–1987, 1989–1992, 2002–2016)
This label imprint founded by Robert Townson in Canada with a record store and a few partners, first appeared with the original release of The Final Conflict in 1986 after agreeing to a distribution deal after securing the rights to release the soundtrack by Jerry Goldsmith through Twentieth Century Fox. The sales of the album were an immediate success for both labels. Then the following year the soundtrack to Lionheart, was released in two separate albums with the cooperation of the composer and forming a positive relationship with Goldsmith that would help Townson and the label move forward in its eventual success.

The label then became a full-fledged series of CDs when the club launched in 1989 and was also a part of the reactivated club in 2001 with the designation of the Special Release Series (SRS). These albums were licensed through A&M Canada and Decca International as Townson had secured the rights to reissue Goldsmith's The Boys From Brazil, Roy Budd's The Wild Geese, Goldsmith's live concert series with the London Philharmonia entitled Suites and Themes and Bernard Herrmann's Obsession, which was one of his two final film scores before his untimely passing in 1975. These were the first set of club CDs that were released and sold in unison with Varèse Sarabande CD Club releases. These, unlike the second generation of club volumes, did not change its numbering system when the club resumed production in 2001. This series also includes the first box set Varèse Sarabande ever produced Bernard Herrmann: The Concert Suites, which was an audiophile set of Decca re-recordings conducted by the composer and two extremely short soundtracks at 20 minutes each in both Under the Volcano which was nominated for an Academy Award in 1984 for its composer Alex North and Those Secrets by Oscar nominee Thomas Newman dubbed as "mini-classics".

There were two confirmed cancellations of titles from the original set of releases which were Lilies of the Field and John Williams' Heartbeeps. No explanation to their cancellation has ever been stated, but Heartbeeps would be the first title to be released as part of the reactivated Varèse Sarabande Club in 2001 after three years of rumors and speculation that this title would be the one the label would reactivate the Soundtrack Club with after its announcement in 1998.

 SRS 2001 The Boys from Brazil - Jerry Goldsmith
 SRS 2002 The Wild Geese - Roy Budd
 SRS 2003 Suites and Themes - Jerry Goldsmith
 SRS 2004 Obsession - Bernard Herrmann
 SRS 2005 – SRS 2008 Bernard Herrmann Concert Suites (Elaborate four-CD box set release of 1970s Decca audiophile albums recorded by the late composer in London featuring a well produced booklet and lavish artwork by the late artist Bob Peak in both paper insert and an outer slipcase to hold the clamshell cases. All titles and contents of this set are listed below)
 SRS 2005 The Concert Suites Volume 1: The Early Classics - Bernard Herrmann
 SRS 2006 The Concert Suites Volume 2: Science Fiction - Bernard Herrmann
 SRS 2007 The Concert Suites Volume 3: Alfred Hitchcock - Bernard Herrmann
 SRS 2008 The Concert Suites Volume 4: The Fantasy Films - Bernard Herrmann
 SRS 2009 The Reivers - John Williams
 SRS 2010 Lilies of the Field - Jerry Goldsmith (Planned, but cancelled. Reissued by Perseverance Records)
 SRS 2011 Under the Volcano - Alex North
 SRS 2012 Heartbeeps - John Williams (Planned, but cancelled – was the first title released in under the reactivated club as well as being the first long-rumored titles in announced in 1998 but finally released in 2001)
 SRS 2013 Those Secrets - Thomas Newman
 SRS 2014 Joe Versus the Volcano - Georges Delerue
 SRS 2015 The Racers / Daddy Long Legs - Alex North
 SRS 2016 The Wonderful Country / The King and Four Queens - Alex North
 SRS 2017 Viva Maria! / King of Hearts - Georges Delerue
 SRS 2018 The Hallelujah Trail - Elmer Bernstein
 SRS 2019 Cannon for Cordoba / From Noon till Three - Elmer Bernstein
 SRS 2020 Joe Versus the Volcano: The Big Woo Edition - Georges Delerue

Varèse 500 Series (2016–2017)
This was a very short-lived series that was unveiled in December 2016 which was similar to the Varèse Encore Series which was designed to reissue out-of-print titles from the commercial catalog from the beginning to the present. These featured new artwork and liner notes for each release which was limited to only 500 copies which is half the run of the Encore Series which was only 1000. Each disc was priced at $15.98 apiece and look similar to the standard releases with the distinct 500 prefix as part of the catalog number and a beautiful logo on the artwork featured.

The series looks to be dormant and unsuccessful as Concord has other plans for the label which include releasing new, older scores and expansions of their vast catalog.

VSD-500 Agnes of God - Georges Delerue
VSD-501 The Winds of War - Bob Cobert
VSD-502 Journey to the Center of the Earth - Bernard Herrmann (This is the version contained in the Bernard Herrmann at 20th Century Fox box)

Andante Records (1982–1984)
This was an offshoot of the label created by Tom Null, which was meant to be dedicated towards classical releases during the early 1980s after the label had begun to be known for its very successful soundtrack releases. While it did concentrate on classical releases, it did attempt two soundtrack releases as a test which were the re-recordings of The Adventures of Robin Hood and Kings Row, both by Erich Wolfgang Korngold originally issued by the label on CD and LP. The prefix for the LPs started with AD and their CDs with ACD.

This label did not last long. It did try the newly minted CD format in 1984 with just a handful of releases and soon after was deactivated. A lot of the classical titles released on LP were then reissued as part of Varèse's 47000 CD series with the same contents and artwork.

 AD-72401 Liszt: Symphony No. 2 "Dante" - Varujan Kojian, Utah Symphony Orchestra
 AD-72402 Harris: Symphony No. 6 Gettysburg / Ives: Overture from the Third Orchestral Set - Keith Clark, Pacific Symphony Orchestra
 AD-72404 Vaughan Williams: Toward the Unknown Region - Norman Del Mar, City of Birmingham Symphony Orchestra and the City of Birmingham Symphony Chorus
 AD-72405 Poulenc: La voix humaine (complete one act opera) - José Serebrier, Adelaide Symphony Orchestra and soloist Carole Farley
 AD-72406 Barber: Capricorn Concerto Op. 21 & Essay for Orchestra No. 1 Op. 12 / Copland: Music for Radio ("Saga of the Prairies" or "Prairie Journal") & An Outdoor Overture - Keith Clark, Pacific Symphony Orchestra
 ACD-85701 Liszt: Symphony No. 2 "Dante" - Varujan Kojian, Utah Symphony Orchestra (Originally released by Varèse Sarabande on CD as VCD-47207. This releases is exactly the same as that release with the exception of the Andante logo replacing the Varèse logo)
 ACD-85705 American Composers: Barber: Capricorn Concerto Op. 21 & Essay for Orchestra No. 1 Op. 12 / Copland: Music for Radio ("Saga of the Prairies" or "Prairie Journal") & An Outdoor Overture / Ives: Overture from the Third Orchestral Set - Keith Clark, Pacific Symphony Orchestra (Originally released by Varèse Sarabande on CD as VCD-47211. This releases is exactly the same as that release with the exception of the Andante logo replacing the Varèse logo)
 ACD-85706 The Adventures of Robin Hood - Erich Wolfgang Korngold / Varujan Kojian, the Utah Symphony Orchestra (Originally released by Varèse Sarabande on CD as VCD-47202. This releases is exactly the same as that release with the exception of the Andante logo replacing the Varèse logo)
 ACD-85707 Kings Row - Erich Wolfgang Korngold / Charles Gerhardt, the National Philharmonic Orchestra (Originally released by Varèse Sarabande on CD as VCD-47203. This releases is exactly the same as that release with the exception of the Andante logo replacing the Varèse logo)

Colossal Records (1989–1992)
This peculiar offshoot of Varèse Sarabande with a name inspired by their German counterpart, Colosseum Schallplatten, which was a short-lived (1989–1992) series that made available scores that were either vanity titles from television mini-series (i.e. Till We Meet Again, The Phantom of the Opera) or titles to lower-profile films (i.e. A Show of Force, Eve of Destruction). The lettering is similar to the regular Varèse Sarabande soundtrack releases with a major difference in both the logo and the spine which contained different colors (i.e. blue, green, purple, etc.) as well as the lettering as opposed to the regular Varèse Sarabande titles which had brown spines and white lettering as well as containing the catalog number (i.e. VSD-5200). The titles on this subsidiary were paid for by the label itself and not by the composers as it had been rumored to have been which was confirmed by the label's executive producer Robert Townson when he was running the label.

The only title in this series, Bed and Breakfast looks like the standard Varèse Sarabande regular releases due to an error in the number sequence.

 XCD-1001 Tiger Warsaw - Ernest Troost (released on LP only, planned for a CD release but cancelled)
 XCD-1002 The Film & Stage Music of Bruce Kimmel (The First Nudie Musical / The Creature Wasn't Nice (Spaceship) / Stages / The Good Ones) - Bruce Kimmel
 XCD-1003 Till We Meet Again - Vladimir Cosma
 XCD-1004 The Phantom of the Opera - John Addison
 XCD-1005 A Show of Force - Georges Delerue
 XCD-1006 Eve of Destruction - Philippe Sarde
 XCD-1008 Bed & Breakfast - David Shire (Technically this title was to be part of Varèse Sarabande's regular run of mainstream titles.) An error occurred during pressing as the title was assigned the catalog no. VSD-5357 (see above) as Death in Venice was also assigned this number which may have been intended as VSD-5358. Rather than cancel the run, the label reassigned it to this series)
 XCD-1009 Frozen Assets - Michael Tavera / Billy Martin

Digital Release Series (2003–present) 
This section is dedicated to Varèse Sarabande titles that have been exclusively released as digital releases via various online websites including iTunes, Amazon and Tidal. Varèse first dabbled into this field in 2003 with their release of Trevor Jones' action score to the Alan Moore adaptation of The League of Extraordinary Gentlemen which met with a bad reception due to collectors wanting an actual physical CD and not a download. A similar situation occurred a year later with the score to the remake of Man on Fire starring Oscar winner Denzel Washington, which was only released only as a digital release with nearly 80 minutes of music and later in the summer of 2004, a physical CD of that score was announced and released due to high demand. However, it was released as a condensed version with the digital release having more music.

In later years, the label released titles as digital only due to the soundtracks' running times or lack of commercial sales. These were often titles to smaller films in the independent market with some studio films being released only in this fashion as well as direct to video or straight Blu-ray or streamed movie titles or television series. Some titles such as The Limehouse Golem, Jasmine and The Nut Job 2: Nutty by Nature have been the only titles thus far to be released as physical CD albeit in very limited quantities of up to 500 copies. A few titles, such as Erased, Drive Hard, Evidence and Imogene (Girl Most Likely) have appeared on Amazon as part of an on demand CDR series in conjunction with labels such as Sony Classical and WaterTower Music which have also appeared in this manner. Numbers in this series are totally random and do not go according to release date. They might also coincide with potential physical release numbers assigned from the main series (5200–7500) from announced releases that were later cancelled as physical CDs (e.g. Maggie, Jane Got a Gun, etc.).

The label's website also announces these digital only releases along with upcoming CDs and LPs in their upcoming releases.

VSDD-0001 The League of Extraordinary Gentlemen - Trevor Jones (The music is identical to the CD release)
VSDD-0002 Man on Fire - Harry Gregson-Williams (Features additional music not available on the Varèse CD)
VSDD-5609 Disobedience - Matthew Herbert
VSDD-5708 Lean on Pete - James Edward Barker
VSDD-6720 No Place on Earth - John Piscitello
VSDD-6721 Evidence - Atli Örvarsson
VSDD-6722 Erased - Jeff Danna (Released as Amazon on demand title)
VSDD-6761 Open Window - Cliff Eidelman
VSDD-6928 Torn - Garry Schyman
VSDD-7161 High Ground - Chris Bacon
VSDD-7168 Bad Karma - Bryce Jacobs
VSDD-7214 Imogene (Girl Most Likely) - Rob Simonsen (Released as Amazon on demand title)
VSDD-7223 The Face of Love - Marcelo Zarvos
VSDD-7224 +1 - Nathan Larson
VSDD-7228 A Haunted House 2 - Jesse Voccia / various artists
VSDD-7235 Plush - Nick Launay / various artists
VSDD-7247 Drive Hard - Bryce Jacobs (Released as Amazon on demand title)
VSDD-7264 Crave - Justin Burnett
VSDD-7265 Siberia - Corey Wallace
VSDD-7281 Life of Crime - the Newton Brothers (Shares identical UPC numbers with Decoding Annie Parker which was released the same year.)
VSDD-7281 Decoding Annie Parker - Steven Bramson (Shares identical UPC numbers with Life of Crime which was released the same year.)
VSDD-7282 Felony - Bryony Marks
VSDD-7288 Ninjago: Masters of Spinjitzu: Season Two - Jay Vincent & Michael Kramer
VSDD-7289 Rosemary's Baby - Antoni Komasa-Łazarkiewicz
VSDD-7310 Hector and the Search for Happiness - Dan Mangan & Jesse Zubot
VSDD-7313 The Riot Club - Kasper Winding
VSDD-7326 Tracers - Lucas Vidal
VSDD-7328 Gloria - Lorne Balfe & Sofía Espinosa
VSDD-7338 An Introduction - Seymour Bernstein
VSDD-7344 Jane Got a Gun - Lisa Gerrard & Marcello De Francisci (Announced as a CD originally with catalog number and subsequently cancelled)
VSDD-7347 The Voices - Olivier Bernet
VSDD-7366 Maggie - David Wingo (Announced as a CD originally with catalog number and subsequently cancelled)
VSDD-7367 Sinister 2 - Tomandandy
VSDD-7379 American Ultra - Marcelo Zarvos & Paul Hartnoll (Announced as a CD originally with catalog number and subsequently cancelled)
VSDD-7396 Flesh and Bone (ballet music from the Starz original series) - Adam Crystal
VSDD-7400 Misconduct - Federico Jusid
VSDD-7435 Tallulah - Michael Brook (Announced as CD originally with catalog number and subsequently cancelled)
VSDD-7456 A Boy Called Po - Burt Bacharach / Joseph Bauer
VSDD-7462 The Affair: Season 2 - Marcelo Zarvos
VSDD-7479 What Happened to Monday - Christian Wibe
VSDD-7493 Gortimer Gibbon's Life on Normal Street: Season 1 & 2 - Sasha Gordon
VSDD-7498 Norman: The Moderate Rise and Tragic Fall of a New York Fixer - Jun Miyake
VSDD-7503 Barry - Danny Bensi & Saunder Jurriaans
VSDD-7506 Random Tropical Paradise - Bryce Jacobs
VSDD-7509 Jasmine - Shie Rozow (Issued as a limited edition CD as part of an intended Signature Series including signed booklets)
VSDD-7518 68 Kill - Frank Ilfman & James Griffiths
VSDD-7538 The Man in the High Castle: Season 3 - Dominic Lewis
VSDD-7540 The Nut Job 2: Nutty by Nature - Heitor Pereira (Issued as a limited edition CD as part of the limited series)
VSDD-7542 Just Getting Started - Alex Wurman
VSDD-7540 Home Again - John Debney
VSDD-7549 5 to 7 - Danny Bensi & Saunder Jurriaans
VSDD-7553 Tiny Christmas - Ryan Shore
VSDD-7739 Where Hands Touch - Anne Chmelewsky
VSDD-7561 The Steam Engines of Oz - George Streicher
VSDD-7581 Replicas - Jose "Pepe" Ojeda & Mark Kilian
VSDD-7670 The Children Act - Stephen Warbeck
VSDD-7919 Time Share - Giorgio Giampà
VSDD-8040 The Devil We Know - Brian Tyler
VSDD-8065 What They Had - Danny Mulhern
VSDD-8220 Ben Is Back - Dickon Hinchliffe
VSDD-8891 The Outpost - James Schafer
VSDD-8800 The Hole in the Ground - Stephen McKeon (Catalog number TBD upon release)
VSDD-8800 Crypto - Nima Fakhrara (Catalog number TBD upon release)
VSDD-8800 The Prime of Miss Jean Brodie - Rod McKuen
VSDD-8000 The Borrowers - Rod McKuen
VSDD-9562 Domino - Pino Donaggio
VSDD-8645 Vita & Virginia - Isobel Waller-Bridge
VSDD-8749 Crisis - Raphael Reed
VSDD-30206115604  Gremlins 2: The New Batch: The Deluxe Edition - Jerry Goldsmith
VSDD-30206628821  The Omen: The Deluxe Edition - Jerry Goldsmith
VSDD-888072209824  The Trial Of The Chicago 7 - Daniel Pemberton
VSDD-888072214125  The Matrix: The Complete Score - Don Davis
VSDD-888072193840  The Running Man: The Deluxe Edition - Harold Faltermeyer
VSDD-888072200920  Village Of The Damned: The Deluxe Edition - John Carpenter & Dave Davies
VSDD-888072223738  How To Train Your Dragon: The Deluxe Edition - John Powell
VSDD-888072250536  Looney Tunes Back In Action: The Deluxe Edition - Jerry Goldsmith / John Debney & Cameron Patrick (additional music)
VSDD-888072251540  The Stand: The Deluxe Edition - W.G. Snuffy Walden
VSDD-888072251878  Air Force One - Jerry Goldsmith & Joel McNeely (additional music)
VSDD-888072251908  Dreamcatcher: The Deluxe Edition - James Newton Howard
VSDD-888072225312  Outbreak: The Deluxe Edition - James Newton Howard
VSDD-888072225329  Dolores Claiborne: The Deluxe Edition - Danny Elfman
VSDD-888072225336  Star Trek: The Deluxe Edition - Michael Giacchino
VSDD-888072225343  Volcano: The Deluxe Edition - Alan Silvestri
VSDD-888072225442  Star Trek Beyond: The Deluxe Edition - Michael Giacchino
VSDD-888072250468  U.S. Marshals: The Deluxe Edition - Jerry Goldsmith
VSDD-888072250482  Babe: The Deluxe Edition - Nigel Westlake
VSDD-888072250499  Wild Wild West: The Deluxe Edition - Elmer Bernstein / Peter Bernstein (additional music)
VSDD-888072251366  Seaquest DSV: The Deluxe Edition - John Debney
VSDD-888072225350  Small Soldiers: The Deluxe Edition - Jerry Goldsmith
VSDD-888072226005  Star Trek Into Darkness: The Deluxe Edition - Michael Giacchino
VSDD-888072226012  The Haunting: The Deluxe Edition - Jerry Goldsmith
VSDD-888072285323  The Crow: The Deluxe Edition - Graeme Revell
VSDD-888072285330  Scream: The Complete Soundtracks Collection - Marco Beltrami
VSDD-888072400160  Paycheck: The Deluxe Edition - John Powell
VSDD-888072400566  Knowing: The Deluxe Edition - Marco Beltrami
VSDD-888072400573  The Cowboys: The Deluxe Edition - John Williams
VSDD-888072401297  On Deadly Ground: The Deluxe Edition - Basil Poledouris
VSDD-888072401341  RoboCop 3: The Deluxe Edition - Basil Poledouris
VSDD-888072401358  Under Siege 2: Dark Territory: The Deluxe Edition - Basil Poledouris
VSDD-888072418738  Executive Decision: The Deluxe Edition - Jerry Goldsmith
VSDD-888072423473  Scream (2022) - Brian Tyler
VSDD-888072439122  The Iron Giant: The Deluxe Edition - Michael Kamen
VSDD-888072461437  The Bourne Identity: The Tumecent Edition - John Powell
VSDD-888072483910  Rudy: The Deluxe Edition - Jerry Goldsmith

Vinyl (special editions and releases / reissues) (2013–present)

The label made a return to vinyl with reissues of some of their older albums on CD (Rudy, Star Wars Trilogy, Blade etc.) to capitalize on the current craze with the format. The label has reissued many titles as special editions in colored or unique vinyl along with new artwork in some cases to distinguish itself from their original LP issues or CDs. Many of these LPs were available through the website or through stores such as Barnes & Noble, Mondo and Fire Records as exclusives and many were released to promote Record Store Day. Many releases were limited to between 1000 and 3000 copies. Some titles are exclusive to the Varèse Sarabande website.

VSD 030206109535 The Right Stuff (blue vinyl) - Bill Conti (Limited edition of 750 copies)
VSD 030206114355 Nemesis (green thalaron vinyl) - Jerry Goldsmith (Two-LP gatefold green thalaron colored vinyl set exclusive only available through Varèse Sarabande's website limited only to 750 copies)
VSD 030206320015 Original Motion Picture Soundtrack (10 inch vinyl WWII "V-Disc") - Steven Price (Record Store Day 2015 exclusive. Limited to 1000 copies. This 10" vinyl album is packaged in a die-cut slipcase, designed to match an authentic WWII "V-Disc", the recordings sent to international bases for armed forces airplay to entertain the troops. Includes nine cues from the acclaimed score, including versions of two tracks exclusive to this vinyl edition. Package includes a download card for digital tracks)
VSD 030206526851 Forbidden Zone (translucent lime green vinyl) - Danny Elfman / Oingo Boingo
VSD 030206528152 The Omen - Jerry Goldsmith (Limited to only 666 hand-numbered copies)
VSD 030206530801 Unforgiven (25th Anniversary Edition) (prairie sand vinyl) - Lennie Niehaus / Clint Eastwood (Barnes & Noble exclusive. Limited to 1000 copies)
VSD 030206544633 Rudy (shamrock green vinyl) - Jerry Goldsmith (CCVinyl.com exclusive. Limited to 800)
VSD 030206544633 Rudy (Irish gold vinyl) - Jerry Goldsmith (Varèse exclusive edition. Limited to 800 copies)
VSD 030206549911 Original Motion Picture Score (180 gram) - Graeme Revell (The outer cover features a new comic book artist rendering of the Crow from a pivotal scene in the film)
VSD 030206654219 Chitty Chitty Bang Bang - Richard M. Sherman, Robert B. Sherman & Irwin Kostal
VSD 030206602630 Original Motion Picture Score (green vinyl) - Don Davis (Newbury Comics exclusive. Limited to between 500 & 1000 copies)
VSD 030206602654 The Matrix (red pill / blue pill color vinyl) - Don Davis (Amazon.com exclusive. Limited to 1500 copies)
VSD 030206606256 The Iron Giant (orange & yellow swirl vinyl) - Michael Kamen (Available exclusively through Books-A-Million and 2nd & Charles locations in the US. Limited to 1000 copies)
VSD 030206606610 Dark Shadows (purple vinyl) - Bob Cobert
VSD 030206606119 The Sixth Sense - James Newton Howard (Limited to 500 hand-numbered copies)
VSD 030206628616 Ghosts of Mars - John Carpenter
VSD 030206635836 Ice Age (picture disc vinyl) - David Newman
VSD 030206636734 The Bourne Identity (military green vinyl) - John Powell (Limited edition to 1000 copies)
VSD 030206691917 The Girl from U.N.C.L.E. - Jerry Goldsmith / Dave Grusin / Richard Shores / Teddy Randazzo (Record Store Day release 2013. Limited to 1000 copies)
VSD 030206709711 Game of Thrones - Ramin Djawadi
VSD 030206719314 Pain & Gain - Steve Jablonsky
VSD 030206719710 Stuck in Love - Mike Mogis & Nate Walcott
VSD 030206719819 Star Trek Into Darkness - Michael Giacchino
VSD 030206722710 Ender's Game - Steve Jablonsky
VSD 030206729856 Penny Dreadful (translucent red vinyl) - Abel Korzeniowski
VSD 030206730951 John Wick (gunmetal vinyl) - Tyler Bates & Joel J. Richard / various artists
VSD 030206732214 Orphan Black - various artists
VSD 030206738018 Carol (Double 10" album) - Carter Burwell / various artists
VSD 030206739015 The Mad Max Trilogy (Mad Max / The Road Warrior / Mad Max Beyond Thunderdome) (gray, black & sand vinyl) - Brian May / Maurice Jarre, Tina Turner (This three-LP set was limited to only 2000 copies and soundtracks have been combined into a stellar deluxe package designed by Marvel comic artist, Tim Bradstreet, (The Punisher, Blade))
VSD 030206739251 The Star Wars Trilogy (blue translucent, red translucent & green translucent lightsaber tri-color vinyl) - John Williams / Varujan Kojian conductor (Newbury Comics exclusive. Limited to 1000 copies)
VSD 030206739718 Star Trek Beyond - Michael Giacchino
VSD 030206741117 Nighthawks - Keith Emerson (Limited to 1000 copies)
VSD 030206743012 Popeye - Harry Nilsson / various artists (Record Store Day Black Friday 2016 release. Limited to 2000 copies)
VSD 030206743616 Barbarella - Bob Crewe & Charles Fox
VSD 030206742510 Roots (30th Anniversary Edition) - Quincy Jones (Limited edition reissue of 1977 album. Limited to 1000 copies)
VSD 030206745917 Wheeler - Wheeler Bryson
VSD 030206748956 Silent Running (green vinyl) - Peter Schickele (Reissue of original Decca release and 1978 Varèse Sarabande green vinyl reissue)
VSD 030206748413 Power Rangers (black vinyl) - Brian Tyler
VSD 030206748437 Power Rangers (Red Ranger vinyl variant) - Brian Tyler (FYE exclusive. Limited to 500 copies)
VSD 030206748444 Power Rangers (Blue Ranger vinyl variant) - Brian Tyler (Indie exclusive. Limited to 500 copies)
VSD 030206748451 Power Rangers (Pink Ranger vinyl variant)) - Brian Tyler (Hot Topic exclusive. Limited to 500 copies)
VSD 030206748468 Power Rangers (Yellow Ranger vinyl variant) - Brian Tyler (Barnes & Noble exclusive. Limited to 500 copies)
VSD 030206749113 Leonard Nimoy Presents Mr. Spock's Music from Outer Space - Leonard Nimoy / various artists
VSD 030206750010 Christine (blue vinyl) - John Carpenter in association with Alan Howarth
VSD 030206750034 Christine (red vinyl) - John Carpenter in association with Alan Howarth
VSD 030206751215 Charlotte's Web - Richard M. Sherman & Robert B. Sherman
VSD 030206751550 The Bad News Bears (yellow vinyl) - Jerry Fielding (Available for the first time on LP as a limited 1000 unit release)
VSD 030206753158 Mad Max (red and gray haze vinyl) - Brian May (Exclusive to Newbury Comics. Limited edition of 750 copies)
VSD 030206753510 Tooth and Tail - Austin Wintory
VSD 030206753615 Three Billboards Outside Ebbing, Missouri - Carter Burwell / various artists
VSD 030206754858 Road House ("Double Deuce" neon blue vinyl) - Jeff Healey Band / various artists (Barnes & Noble exclusive edition. Limited to 1000 copies)
VSD 030206755411 Fletch - Harold Faltermeyer / various artists
VSD 030206755619 Knight Rider - Stu Phillips (Two LP Record Store Day 2019 exclusive. Limited to 2000 copies)
VSD 030206757415 V For Vendetta - Dario Marianelli / various artists (Two-LP set featuring original artwork by Gary Pullin)
VSD 030206757859 Pee-wee's Big Adventure / Back to School (red vinyl) - Danny Elfman / John Coleman, conductor
VSD 030206758412 Sicario: Day of the Soldado - Hildur Guðnadóttir
VSD 030206829210 Blue Velvet - Angelo Badalamenti / various artists
VSD 030206666359 Stripes (red, white & blue vinyl) - Elmer Bernstein (CCVinyl.com exclusive. Limited to 1000 copies)
VSD 030206668216 Serenity - David Newman (Barnes & Noble exclusive. Two-LP vinyl set. Limited to 1500 copies)
VSD 030206669916 Firefly - Greg Edmonson (Barnes & Noble exclusive. Two-LP gatefold vinyl. Limited to 1800 copies)
VSD 030206701210 How to Train Your Dragon (dragon eye green vinyl) - John Powell (Record Store Day 2016 release. Limited to 2000 copies)
VSD 030206709513 The Family Way - Paul McCartney (2015 Record Store Day exclusive release)
VSD 030206714814 Game of Thrones: Season 2 - Ramin Djawadi (Two-LP set that was initially sold exclusively through Barnes & Noble, but then later made available through other retailers)
VSD 030206728613 Whiplash - Justin Hurwitz / various artists (Released for Record Store Day 2015)
VSD 030206728613 Whiplash (clear vinyl) - Justin Hurwitz / various artists (Newbury Comics exclusive. Limited to 500 copies)
VSD 030206728613 Whiplash (red vinyl) - Justin Hurwitz / various artists (CCVinyl.com exclusive. Limited to 1000 copies)
VSD 030206731415 Orange Is the New Black - Gwendolyn Sanford, Brandon Jay, Scott Doherty
VSD 030206731415 Orange Is the New Black (orange vinyl) - Gwendolyn Sanford, Brandon Jay, Scott Doherty (Record Store Day 2015 release. Limited to 2200 copies)
VSD 030206731514 Keep On Keepin' On - Dave Grusin / Clark Terry / Quincy Jones (Two-LP vinyl set. The first 200 copies included a postcard sized replica of the film poster autographed by Quincy Jones)
VSD 030206736915 Sicario - Jóhann Jóhannsson (Two-LP edition)
VSD 030206739213 The Star Wars Trilogy (standard vinyl) - John Williams / Varujan Kojian conductor
VSD 888072101487 The Fly (1986) (teleporter fog green vinyl) - Howard Shore
VSD 888072101500 Scream/Scream 2 (red vinyl) - Marco Beltrami
VSD 888072105874 Heathers (30th Anniversary) (very green neon vinyl) - David Newman
VSD 888072029248 Shaft (1971) (Two-LP 180 g vinyl) - Isaac Hayes
VSD 888072063006 Varèse Sarabande: 40 Years of Great Film Music 1978–2018 - various artists
VSD 888072069671 The Zombies: Complete Studio Recordings (Five-LP vinyl box set) - the Zombies
VSD 888072070103 L.A. Confidential - Jerry Goldsmith
VSD 888072073760 Fritz the Cat (picture disc) - Ed Bogas & Ray Shanklin / various artists (Record Store Day Black Friday 2018 - Limited to 2500 copies)
VSD 888072073869 Vertigo (60th anniversary vinyl) - Bernard Herrmann (Remastered from the original analog tapes pressed at RTI (Record Technology) on to 180 gm vinyl, and slipped into a classic tip-on jacket from Stoughton Press)
VSD 888072077584 Krypton (orange / yellow galaxy color vinyl) - Pinar Toprak (Record Store Day 2019 exclusive. Limited edition of 1350 copies)
VSD 888072080294 The Last of the Mohicans (re-recording) (tan vinyl) - Trevor Jones / Randy Edelman, Joel McNeely, conductor (First time release on LP, available through Barnes & Noble)
VSD 888072082144 I Know What You Did Last Summer (red vinyl) - various artists (Two-LP Record Store Day 2019 release. Limited to 1350 copies)
VSD 888072088382 Star Trek - Michael Giacchino (Record Store Day 2019 release. Limited to 2000 copies)
VSD 888072089860 The Goonies (gold vinyl) - Dave Grusin (Two-LP vinyl set. Limited to 750 hand-numbered copies only available through the Varèse Sarabande website)
VSD 888072089013 Gremlins 2: The New Batch - Jerry Goldsmith (Two-LP set only available at Varèse Sarabande's website limited to 750 copies. This is the deluxe edition released as part of the Varèse Club)
VSD 888072086067 Farscape: 20th Anniversary Edition (gold vinyl) - Guy Gross / Subvision (Limited edition vinyl featuring unreleased bonus tracks)
VSD 888072086876 Carlito's Way - Patrick Doyle (Barnes & Noble exclusive, limited to 1000 copies)
VSD 888072092051 How to Train Your Dragon (picture disc vinyl) - John Powell (Comes with a four-page fold out poster)
VSD 888072105874 Vince Guaraldi - It's The Great Pumpkin, Charlie Brown (etched black vinyl) - Vince Guaraldi
VSD 888072100060 Blade - Mark Isham
VSD 888072122918 John Wick - Tyler Bates & Joel J. Richard / various artists (Two-LP gatefold vinyl set with added bonus track Marilyn Manson's "Killing Strangers", not available on the CD or digital releases)
VSD 888072122987 John Wick: Chapter 2 - Tyler Bates & Joel J. Richard / various artists (Two-LP gatefold vinyl set)
VSD 888072122949 John Wick: Chapter 3 – Parabellum - Tyler Bates & Joel J. Richard / various artists (Two-LP vinyl gatefold set)
VSD 888072113664 Jim Henson's Emmet Otter's Jug-Band Christmas - Paul Williams (Released in Canada as Black Friday 2019 release. Limited edition of 2500 copies)
VSD 888072149618 The Dark Crystal: Age of Resistance: Volumes 1 & 2 - Daniel Pemberton / Samuel Sim
VSD 888072157835 The Buddy Holly Story: Deluxe Edition - various artists
VSD 888072172975 Star Wars: Shadows of the Empire - Joel McNeely / John Williams ("Star Wars Theme")
VSD 888072173002 The Holiday (snow-white vinyl) - Hans Zimmer
VSD 888072173040 Xena Warrior Princess: Lyre, Lyre, Hearts On Fire (picture disc vinyl) - Joseph LoDuca / various artists
VSD 888072181400 The Running Man: Deluxe Edition - Harold Faltermeyer (Features the same contents as the Varèse Club CD as a two-LP gatefold package features original artwork created by Florian Mihr and includes images from the film and extensive liner notes by Daniel Schweiger on the inner sleeves)
VSD 888072195509 Game of Thrones (White Walker vinyl) - Ramin Djawadi (Two-LP vinyl limited edition released in Europe)
VSD 888072204898 Elf (picture disc) - John Debney (Only available through Walmart as an exclusive vinyl LP)
VSD 888072227279 The Trial of the Chicago 7 - Daniel Pemberton
VSD 888072240445 The Empire Strikes Back - John Williams / Charles Gerhardt cond. (Reissue of Suite conducted by Gerhardt on Chalfont Records in 1980 and later released on CD by the label as 47204 & 5353. LP is the contents as the original LP and subsequent CD releases)
VSD 888072369948 Amadeus: Deluxe Vinyl Box Set - various artists (Special box set features the 180-gram three vinyl album, a theatrical poster and a 16-page booklet, complete with new liner notes by the film's conductor, Sir Neville Marriner, plus original liner notes by Grover Sales, a story overview and detailed information on each track)
VSD 888072234550 The Sound Of Music - Julie Andrews / Various (LP reissue of classic 1965 film of the original soundtrack album)
VSD 888072369962 J.R.R. Tolkien's The Lord of the Rings: Deluxe Vinyl Box Set - Leonard Rosenman (Two-LP gatefold set)
VSD 888072265783 The Crow: The Deluxe Edition - Graeme Revell (This 2 LP set features the complete score by Revell and includes the song "It Can't Rain All The Time" performed by Jane Siberry) 
VSD 888072266926 Scream: Original Motion Picture Soundtracks - Marco Beltrami (Four LP set of scores from all four original Scream films previously issued on CD by the label.)
VSD 888072414006 The Bourne Identity - John Powell (This is the LP issue of the 2002 release of the soundtrack and not the Varese Club Deluxe Edition)
VSD 888072419001 The Iron Giant: The Deluxe Edition - Michael Kamen (black vinyl) (Two-LP remastered release of soundtrack previously released as part of the Varese CD Club.)
VSD 888072417915 Scream (2022)- Brian Tyler (clear red and smoke vinyl) (Release of score also released on CD of Tyler's score on specialized vinyl. Limited to only 300 copies sold exclusively through the Varese Sarabande website)
VSD 888072417922 Scream (2022) - Brian Tyler (Release of score also released on CD on standard black vinyl)
VSD 888072409385 The Matrix: The Complete Edition (black vinyl) - Don Davis (Three-LP release June 12, 2021. This features the same contents as the Varèse Club CD release expanded to 44 tracks, and housed in a new art design. Also included are classic film stills and an exclusive new interview with composer Don Davis)
VSD 888072426429 The Omen - Jerry Goldsmith (red-black splatter) (LP reissue of original 1976 album of Academy Award Winning soundtrack)
VSD 888072428041 Firestarter - Tangerine Dream (fuego orange vinyl) (Reissue of 1984 soundtrack on special colored vinyl. Limited to only 1500 Copies sold exclusively through the Varese Sarabande website)
VSD 888072448025 The Iron Giant: The Deluxe Edition - Michael Kamen (green vinyl) (Two-LP remastered release of soundtrack previously released as part of the Varese CD Club. This Green Vinyl version is sold exclusively through the Varese site)
VSD 00199 The Matrix (picture disc vinyl) - Don Davis (This vinyl features the same contents as the red pill / blue pill colored vinyl)
VSD 00206 Hackers (25th Anniversary) - Simon Boswell / various artists (Record Store Day exclusive release September 26, 2020, limited edition of 2500 copies)
VSD 00065 Mortal Kombat (25th Anniversary) - George S. Clinton (Record Store Day exclusive release September 26, 2020, limited edition of 1500 copies)
VSD 030206729856 Penny Dreadful - Abel Korzenowski 
VSD 00000 The Matrix (glitter-infused green vinyl) - Don Davis (Record Store Day exclusive three-LP release June 12, 2021. This features the same contents as the Varèse Club CD release expanded to 44 tracks, and housed in a new art design. Also included are classic film stills and an exclusive new interview with composer Don Davis)
VSD 00000 The Goonies (35th Anniversary) (picture disc vinyl) - Dave Grusin (Record Store Day exclusive June 12, 2021. The special release features the album cover on side A and the infamous One-Eyed Willie on side B. The track listing to this abbreviated single-disc version of the original score was personally selected and assembled by Grusin himself)
VSD 00000 Village of the Damned: Deluxe Edition (orange haze vinyl) - John Carpenter & Dave Davies (Record Store Day exclusive June 12, 2021. This two-LP vinyl features the same content as the recent Varèse Club CD release. The album includes all-new original art direction with new notes and classic film stills)
VSD 00000 Shrek (20th Anniversary) (green vinyl) - Harry Gregson-Williams & John Powell (Record Store Day exclusive June 12, 2021. Limited to 1000 copies)
VSD 00000 The Iron Giant (picture disc vinyl) - Michael Kamen (Record Store Day exclusive July 17, 2021)
VSD 00000 Ghosts of Mars (20th Anniversary) (Red Planet color vinyl) - John Carpenter (Record Store Day exclusive July 17, 2021. Limited to 1000 copies)
VSD 00000 Aliens: 35th Anniversary (acid-blood yellow-green vinyl) - James Horner (Record Store Day exclusive July 17, 2021. Limited to 1000 copies)
VSD 00000 Death Becomes Her: The Deluxe Edition - Alan Silvestri (purple vinyl) (Expanded release of Silvestri's 1992 score which will also be released as part of the Varese CD Club. This is a Black Friday Record Store Day release for November 2022)
VSD 00000 Mimic - Marco Beltrami (green vinyl) (This is a Black Friday Record Store Day release for November 2022)
VSD 00000 The Cowboys: The Deluxe Edition - John Williams (gold vinyl) (2 LP reissue of original Varese Club CD title. This is a Black Friday Record Store Day release for November 2022)
MOND-035 The Iron Giant - Michael Kamen (Two-LP remastered release by Mondo 2019 with metal slipcase)
MOND-125 Speed Racer (white with red racing stripe vinyl) - Michael Giacchino (Two-LP exclusive set released through Mondo. Remastered edition. Limited to 1000 copies)
FROST003LP Blue Velvet (blue & blue split vinyl) - Angelo Badalamenti / various artists (Limited edition release through Fire Records)

The cancelled albums (1987–present)
Like all record labels, Varèse has had their fair share of cancelled albums that were planned, announced to the public and for some reason, such as legal issues or the films' failure at the box office, the recording is not published. There are other cases such as Elmer Bernstein's The Good Son and Brian Reitzell's 30 Days of Night in which the label announced a release only for another label to release it.

Many have what are considered "phantom" numbers during the early days of the label meaning that they were planned and given a catalog number and then be cancelled. Many of these "cancellations" are listed in the CD catalog throughout the 47000, 704, 5200, and 6000 series of releases as well as the Varèse Sarabande Club and Masters Film Music series. Many were announced at publications such as Film Score Monthly and the Muze music database which provided information for CD releases in record stores. And eventually websites such as Amazon also offer the same information as part of their pre-orders.

This list below corresponds to titles that were planned and announced by the label but were never fulfilled. Some pertain to legal publishing and copyright conflicts and others due to uncooperative studios, production companies and lost orchestral sketches, deteriorated, lost or misplaced recording session tapes. While the ones listed within the catalog do have an official number, others do not and will be labeled as VSDC-0000 (Varèse Sarabande disc cancellation) and year of announcement (1998, 2000, etc.).

 SRS 2010 Lilies of the Field - Jerry Goldsmith (Planned, but cancelled. Reissued by Perseverance Records)
 SRS 2012 Heartbeeps - John Williams (Planned, but cancelled – was the first title released for the reactivated club as well as being the first of the long-rumored titles announced in 1998 but released in 2001)
 XCD-1001 Tiger Warsaw - Ernest Troost (Released on LP, planned for a CD release but cancelled)
 VCD-47299 The Penitent - Alex North (Planned, assigned a catalog number and cancelled. Tapes are presumed lost)
 VCD-70452 Two Moon Junction - Jonathan Elias (Released on LP and announced on CD but ultimately cancelled without explanation. Released in 1994 as VSD-5518)
 VCD-70453 Lady In White - Frank LaLoggia (Released on LP and announced on CD but ultimately cancelled without explanation. Released by East West Records in 1997 and expanded by Intrada Records around 2018)
 VCD-70456 Bad Dreams - Jay Ferguson (Announced, assigned a catalog number and cancelled. Finally released as part of Varèse Sarabande's LP-to-CD Subscription Series)
 VCD-70457 Dead Heat - Ernest Troost (Announced, assigned a catalog number and cancelled. Available on LP and cassette only)
 VCD-704?? "Predator / Die Hard" - Alan Silvestri / Michael Kamen (Announced with a pending catalog number and cancelled. The label had planned a double feature disc of both popular scores for an album containing approx. 15 Minute suites of both scores that would've been recorded in Europe had the film scores been recorded there. Ultimately, Twentieth Century-Fox (now part of Disney) decided to record the scores in Los Angeles and the title was scrapped. Around 1993, Fox Film Scores had a similar idea and planned a release utilizing the music recorded at the Los Angeles recording sessions for both scores. However, it would've been approx. 45 Minutes of Predator and 30 Minutes of Die Hard on one disc. This release was also cancelled. Varese Sarabande would ultimately release both scores individually as part of the revival of their CD Club in 2002 (Die Hard) and 2003 (Predator) respectively)
 VSD-5336 Dutch - Alan Silvestri / various artists (Assigned a number, planned for release and cancelled)
 VSD-5362 Rock-a-Doodle - Robert Folk / T.J. Kuenster (Assigned a number, planned for release and cancelled. Released in Germany by the Good Music Label)
 VSD-5387 Whispers in the Dark - Thomas Newman (Assigned a number, planned for release and cancelled)
 VSD-5458 The Good Son - Elmer Bernstein (Assigned a number, planned for release and cancelled. Subsequently, released by Fox Movie Scores)
 VSD-5474 Mother's Boys - George S. Clinton (Assigned a number, planned for release and cancelled)
 VSD-5650 Lost Civilizations - Joe Delia (This was music for the ten hour NBC Series which was announced, assigned catalog number and then cancelled. Released as an agency promotional CD for the composer)
 VSD-5745 Alaska - Reg Powell (Planned, assigned a catalog number and cancelled)
 VSD-6016 Analyze This - Howard Shore / various artists (Announced, assigned catalog number and canceled)
 VSD-6126 Wonder Boys - Christopher Young (Assigned a number, planned for release and cancelled. A promo was produced and released for Oscar consideration)
 VSD-6203 Legend: The Deluxe Edition - Jerry Goldsmith (Assigned a number, planned for release and cancelled. Reissued by Silva Screen Records in 2002. Eventually expanded by Music Box Records in cooperation with Silva Screen Records in 2021.)
 VSD-6352 Dinotopia - Trevor Jones (Assigned a number, planned for release and cancelled. Released on CMP Records)
 VSD-6751 Idlewild - John Debney (Assigned a number, planned for release and cancelled. FYC promo exists)
 VSD-6822 Lucky You - Christopher Young (Assigned a number, planned for release and cancelled. Composer promo featuring more music than planned for a regular public release was released soon after)
 VSD-6858 30 Days of Night - Brian Reitzell (Announced, assigned a catalog number and cancelled. Released by Ipac Recordings in 2007)
 VSD-6935 Righteous Kill - Edward Shearmur (Assigned a number, planned for release and cancelled)
 VSD-7001 It's Complicated - Hans Zimmer & Heitor Pereira (Announced and immediately cancelled by Zimmer due to the brevity of the score (approx. 17 minutes). Released digitally through Back Lot Music)
 VSD-7035 The Special Relationship - Alexandre Desplat (Assigned a number, planned for release and cancelled. Released as part of the Limited Edition series. in 2010. Please see above)
 VSD-7323 The Newsroom - Thomas Newman / John Beal (Announced, assigned a catalog number and cancelled)
 VSD-7344 Jane Got a Gun - Lisa Gerrard / Marcello De Francisci (Announced, assigned a catalog number and cancelled)
 VSD-7360 Maggie - David Wingo (Digital download release, CD was planned but cancelled)
 VSDC-1986 King Kong Lives - John Scott, the Graunke Symphony Orchestra (Planned as a 47000 title, the label made a deal with MCA Records to sell the release rights to them and the soundtrack was then released through them since MCA felt the movie would be a hit at the box office during Christmastime 1986. Richard Kraft and Tom Null are credited as executive producers on the album, which is the give away that the label produced this title first. MCA Records also planned this as a CD release but that never materialized due to the film's box office failure. The LP catalog number is STV 81302 which is scratched off the LP itself as proof of being a Varese title.)
 VSDC-1997 The Relic - John Debney (Planned as a regular release as a late 5700 numbered title originally planned for a 1996 late summer release until the studio (Paramount Pictures) delayed the film until January 1997)
 VSDC-1997/1998 The Great Escape - Elmer Bernstein (re-recording) the Royal Scottish National Orchestra (Re-recording of score conducted by Bernstein which was recorded in 1997 and produced by Robert Townson which was eventually sold to RCA/Victor and released in 1999)
 VSDC-1997/1998 The Magnificent Seven - Elmer Bernstein (re-recording) the Royal Scottish National Orchestra (Re-recording of famed score conducted by Bernstein which was recorded in 1997 and produced by Robert Townson which was eventually sold to RCA/Victor and released in 1999)
 VSDC-1998 The Die Hard Trilogy - Michael Kamen, the Royal Scottish National Orchestra (Planned compilation re-recording featuring suites from all three Die Hard films, was announced in 1998 and then subsequently cancelled soon after)
 VSDC-1998 Franz Waxman: Legends of Hollywood: Volume Five - Franz Waxman, Richard Mills conductor. Queensland Orchestra (Announced in 1998 as another re-recording addition to their previously released four volumes of music for the legendary composer. Due to be recorded in late 1998, early 1999, this never materialized and nothing was heard of the project)
 VSDC-1999 Bernard Herrmann at 20th Century Fox - Bernard Herrmann (Originally planned as a two-disc set of titles devoted to the Golden Age composer but this was cancelled and rethought as separate individual three-disc volumes featuring suites from various scores released during 1999 in this variation. In 2011, the label released a more comprehensive 14-disc limited edition box set featuring the material on the three volumes in complete form through the Varèse Club and was limited to 1000 copies)
 VSDC-1999 Jerry Goldsmith at 20th Century Fox - Jerry Goldsmith (Originally planned as a two-disc set of titles devoted to the Oscar winning composer but this was cancelled. In 2004, the label released a more comprehensive six-disc limited edition box set the Varèse Club on Goldsmith's birthday (February 10, 2004) and was limited to 1500 copies that featured three discs of unreleased material in suites and almost complete scores due to the sources available at the time of release)
 VSDC-1998 Godzilla - Akira Ifukube, the Royal Scottish National Orchestra (Planned re-recording to coincide with the release of the 1998 Sony film was cancelled due to legal rights with the Toho film company in retaining the material to re-record the music)
 VSDC-2000 Highlander - Michael Kamen, the Royal Scottish National Orchestra (Planned re-recording of popular in-demand score under the baton of Kamen, was in the planning stages until it was put on hold due to the composer's failing health and never materialized)

References

 
Lists of albums
Discographies of American record labels